= 1934–35 FC Basel season =

FC Basel
1934–35 season
- Chairman: Franz Rinderer
- First team coach: Richard (Dombi) Kohn
- Ground: Landhof, Basel
- Nationalliga: 5th
- Swiss Cup: Semi-final
- Top goalscorer: League: Otto Haftl (21); All: Otto Haftl (23)
- Highest home attendance: 6,000 on 12 May 1935 vs Servette
- Lowest home attendance: 2,000 on 19 May 1935 vs Lugano
- Average home league attendance: 4,423

The FC Basel 1934–35 season was the forty-second season since the club was foundation on 15 November 1893. FC Basel played their home games in the Landhof in the district Wettstein in Kleinbasel. The club chairman Franz Rinderer, who was the president for the fourth consecutive season.

== Overview ==
The Austrian trainer Richard (Dombi) Kohn was appointed as the new FC Basel trainer. He followed his fellow Austrian Josef Haist, who had taken over after the death of Karl Kurz during the previous season. The team played a total of 38 matches in their 1934–35 season. 26 of these matches were in the Nationalliga, five matches were in the Swiss Cup and seven were friendly matches. Of these seven friendlies six were played in the Landhof and the other game was played away against Luzern. Of theses matches four ended with a victory. However the visiting teams Racing Club Paris, Manchester City and Rapid Wien proved to be too strong for the home team.

The 1934–35 Nationalliga had been again reformed. The number of teams had been reduced by two teams. The championship was contested by 14 teams and was played in a double round robin. Basel started the season well, winning nine of the first eleven games. However the second half of the season was not that good and the team slipped in the table. They finished the Nationalliga season in fifth position in the table, with 12 victories from the 26 games and 28 points. They were 13 points behind Lausanne-Sport, who won the championship. Otto Haftl was the Basel's best goal scorer with 21 goals, Alfred Jaeck second best with 13.

In the 1st principal round of the Swiss Cup Basel were drawn away against and defeated lower tier Bellinzona. In both the second and third round drawn at home against lower classed St. Gallen and Chiasso. The quarter-final was won at home against Lugano. In the semi-final Basel were drawn away against local rivals Nordstern Basel, but suffered a defeat. Lausanne-Sport won the final against Nordstern 10–0 and therefore they completed the national double.

== Players ==
The following is the list of the Basel first team squad during the season 1934–35. The list includes players that were in the squad the day the season started on 11 August 1934 but subsequently left the club after that date.

Note: Flags indicate national team as defined under FIFA eligibility rules; some limited exceptions apply. Players may hold more than one non-FIFA nationality.

| No. | Pos. | Nation | Player |
|---|---|---|---|
| — | GK | SUI | Willy Hufschmid |
| — | GK | SUI | Kurt Imhof |
| — | DF | SUI | Robert Büchi |
| — | DF | GER | Hermann Enderlin (II) |
| — | MF | SUI | Ernst Hufschmid |
| — | DF | GER | Emil Hummel |
| — | DF | SUI | Heinrich Diethelm |
| — | MF | SUI | Hans Greiner |
| — | MF | SUI | Caspar Monigatti |

| No. | Pos. | Nation | Player |
|---|---|---|---|
| — | MF | SUI | Paul Schaub |
| — | MF | SUI | Fritz Schmidlin (I) |
| — | MF | SUI | Ferdinand Spichiger |
| — | MF | SUI | Eduard Zuber |
| — | FW | SUI | Enrico Ardizzoia |
| — | FW | SUI | Karl Bielser |
| — | FW | AUT | Otto Haftl |
| — | FW | SUI | Alfred Jaeck |
| — | FW | SUI | Walter Müller |
| — | FW | SUI | Alfred Schlecht |

Players who left the squad

Note: Flags indicate national team as defined under FIFA eligibility rules; some limited exceptions apply. Players may hold more than one non-FIFA nationality.

| No. | Pos. | Nation | Player |
|---|---|---|---|
| — | GK | SUI | Emil Blattmann |
| — | DF | AUT | Josef Chloupek |

| No. | Pos. | Nation | Player |
|---|---|---|---|
| — | MF | CZE | Vlastimil Borecký |
| — | FW | SUI | Adolf Frey |
| — | FW | AUT | Ferdinand Wesely |

== Results ==
=== Legend ===
Win Draw Loss Postponed

=== Friendly matches ===
==== Pre-season ====
| 11 August 1934 Pre-season | Basel | 4–1 | FC Liestal | Landhof, Basel |
| 17:30 | Müller (1x); Zuber (1x); Schlecht (1x); Hufschmid (1x) | Summary | (1x) Casartelli | Attendance: 600; Referee: (Switzerland) Kettler Basel |

| 16 August 1934 Pre-season | Basel | 2–1 | CE Sabadell | Landhof, Basel |
| 18:30 | Schlecht 15' (1:0); Müller (2:0) | Summary | (2:1) Calvet | Attendance: 2,500; Referee: (Switzerland) Mettler Basel |

| 19 August 1934 Pre-season | Luzern | 3–4 | Basel | Stadion Allmend, Luzern |
| | Treier (1x); Tritz (2x) | Summary | (2x) Haftl (1x) Schlecht (1x) Zuber | Attendance: 900; Referee: (Switzerland) Bühler Luzern |

==== Mid- and end of season ====
| 1 May 1935 Mid-season | Basel | 2–3 | Racing Club Paris | Landhof, Basel |
| 15:00 | Schott 17' (1:1); Schott 25' (2:1) | Summary | 16' (0:1) Bohé; 65' (2:2) Galey; 84' (2:3) Adelbrecht | Attendance: 2,000; Referee: (Switzerland) Traub Basel |

| 22 May 1935 End of season | Basel | 1–5 | Manchester City | Landhof, Basel |
| 18:30 | Greiner 53' (1:2) | Summary | 9' (0:1) Brook; 29' (pen. 0:2) Brook (1:3) Tilson; 69' (1:4) Tilson; 77' (1:5) Herd | Attendance: 5,000; Referee: (Switzerland) Karl Wunderlin Basel |

| 30 May 1935 End of season | Basel | 3–2 | Everton | Landhof, Basel |
| 15.30 | Schott 9' (1:0); Büche 15' (2:0); Büche 74' (pen. 3:2) | Summary | 21' (2:1) Dean; 43' (2:2) Dean | Attendance: 7,000; Referee: (Switzerland) Feurer Delémont |

| 6 June 1935 End of season | Basel | 0–2 | Rapid Wien | Landhof, Basel |
| 18:30 | | Summary | 20' (0:1) Fritz; 38' (2:0) Kaburek | Attendance: 3,500; Referee: (Switzerland) Karl Wunderlin Basel |

=== Nationalliga ===
==== League matches ====
| 26 August 1934 Round 1 | Basel | 4–1 | Young Boys | Landhof, Basel |
| 10:15 | Schaub (1:1); Schlecht 32' (2:1); Haftl 46' (3:1); Siegrist 69' (o.g. 4:1) | Summary | 7' (0:1) Guerne | Attendance: 3,500; Referee: (Switzerland) Enderli Winterthur |

| 1 September 1934 Round 2 | Basel | 1–0 | Grasshopper Club | Landhof, Basel |
| 17:20 | Schlecht 16' (1:0) | Summary | | Attendance: 5,000; Referee: (Switzerland) W. Bangerter La Chaux-de-Fonds |

| 8 September 1934 Round 3 | Nordstern Basel | 0–1 | Basel | Stadion Rankhof, Basel |
| 17:00 | | Summary | 65' (0:1) Jaeck | Attendance: 4,000; Referee: (Switzerland) Spengler Olten |

| 15 September 1934 Round 4 | Basel | 3–0 | Locarno | Landhof, Basel |
| 16:30 | Jaeck 52' (1:0); Haftl 83' (2:0); Müller 86' (3:0) | Summary | | Attendance: 4,000; Referee: (Switzerland) Enderli Winterthur |

| 23 September 1934 Round 5 | Lausanne-Sport | 5–3 | Basel | Olympique de la Pontaise, Lausanne |
| 15:00 | Stelzer 32' (1:1); Adolf Stelzer 34' (2:1); Jäggi 45' (pen. 3:2); Jäggi 49' (4:2); Hochsträsser 89' (5:3) | Summary | 3' (0:1) Schlecht; 44' (2:2) Jaeck (4:3) Zuber | Attendance: 5,000; Referee: (Switzerland) W. Bangerter La Chaux-de-Fonds |

| 30 September 1934 Round 6 | Basel | 3–1 | FC Bern | Landhof, Basel |
| 15:00 | Spichiger 9' (1:0); Müller 32' (2:0); Haftl 75' (3:0) | Summary | 81' (3:1) Bösch | Attendance: 4,000; Referee: (Switzerland) Wittwer Geneva |

| 21 October 1934 Round 7 | Basel | 2–0 | Etoile Carouge | Stadion Rankhof, Basel |
| 13:15 | Jaeck 30' (1:0); Jaeck 55' (2:0) | Summary | | Attendance: 4,000; Referee: (Switzerland) Allemann Biel/Bienne |

| 28 October 1934 Round 8 | Basel | 2–3 | La Chaux-de-Fonds | Landhof, Basel |
| 13:15 | Müller 48' (1:0); Haftl (pen. 2:0) | Summary | (2:1) Barbera (2:2) Samai; 70' (2:3) Samai | Attendance: 4,500; Referee: (Switzerland) Sally Rosenbaum Zürich/St. Gallen |

| 25 November 1934 Round 9 | Biel-Bienne | 1–2 | Basel | Gurzelen Stadion, Biel/Bienne |
| | Loup 65' (1:0) | Summary | 72' (1:1) Schaub; 88' (1:2) Jaeck | Attendance: 2,500; Referee: (Switzerland) Meyer Lausanne |

| 9 December 1934 Round 10 | Young Fellows Zürich | 1–9 | Basel | Förrlibuck, Zürich |
| | Diebold 26' (1:4) | Summary | 4' (0:1) Jaeck; 27' (0:2) Haftl; 30' (pen. 0:3) Jaeck; 35' (0:4) Haftl (1:5) Haftl; 61' (1:6) Jaeck; 70' (1:7) Haftl; 71' (1:8) Haftl; 88' (1:3) Hufschmid | Attendance: 3,500; Referee: (Switzerland) Allemann Biel/Bienne |

| 16 December 1934 Round 11 | Concordia Basel | 1–7 | Basel | Stadion Schützenmatte, Basel |
| 14:30 | Krogmeyer 69' (1:5) | Summary | 4' (0:1) Haftl; 14' (0:2) Jaeck (0:3) Hufschmid; 23' (0:4) Hufschmid; 45' (0:5) Haftl; 74' (1:6) Haftl (1:7) Müller | Attendance: 4,500; Referee: (Switzerland) Enderli Winterthur |

| 23 December 1934 Round 12 | Servette | 3–0 | Basel | Charmilles Stadium, Geneva |
| | Kielholz 41' (1:0); Buchoux 69' (2:0); Kielholz 79' (3:0) | Summary | | Attendance: 3,500; Referee: (Switzerland) Allemann Biel/Bienne |

| 30 December 1934 Round 13 | Lugano | 3–1 | Basel | Campo Marzio, Lugano |
| | Amadò 2' (1:0); Amadò 15' (2:1); Poretti 85' (3:1) | Summary | 3' (1:1) Haftl | Attendance: 4,000; Referee: (Switzerland) W. Bangerter La Chaux-de-Fonds |

| 6 January 1935 Round 14 | Young Boys | 4–4 | Basel | Wankdorf Stadium, Bern |
| | Rufer 10' (1:1); Samek 26' (2:2); Schmid 53' (3:3); Artimovicz 76' (4:3) | Summary | 8' (0:1) Schlecht (1:2) Hufschmid; 51' (2:3) Hufschmid (4:4) Haftl | Attendance: 6,000; Referee: (Switzerland) Spengler Olten |

| 13 January 1935 Round 15 | Grasshopper Club | 3–1 | Basel | Hardturm, Zürich |
| 14:30 | Kamm 20' (1:0); Springer 31' (2:0); Kamm 85' (3:1) | Summary | 38' (2:1) Schlecht | Attendance: 2,500; Referee: (Switzerland) Meyer Lausanne |

| 20 January 1935 Round 16 | Basel | 4–1 | Nordstern Basel | Landhof, Basel |
| 14:30 | Haftl 35' (1:0); Schaub 50' (2:0); Jaeck 77' (3:1); Müller 85' (4:1) | Summary | (2:1) Mohler | Attendance: 4,500; Referee: (Switzerland) Wittwer Geneva |

| Round 17 | Locarno | PP | Basel | Stadio del Lido, Locarno |
| | | [ Summary] |

| 17 February 1935 Round 18 | Basel | 0–1 | Lausanne-Sport | Landhof, Basel |
| 15:00 | | Summary | 22' (0:1) Stelzer | Attendance: 5,000; Referee: (Switzerland) W. Bangerter La Chaux-de-Fonds |

| 24 February 1935 Round 19 | FC Bern | 6–0 | Basel | Neufeld, Bern |
| | Bösch 28' (1:0); Billeter 55' (2:0); Bösch 75' (3:0); Kohler 76' (3:0); Bösch 80' (5:0); Bösch 85' (6:0) | Summary | | Attendance: 4,000; Referee: (Switzerland) Sally Rosenbaum Zürich/St. Gallen |

| 10 March 1935 Round 20 | Etoile Carouge | 2–2 | Basel | Stade de la Fontenette, Carouge |
| | Gregori (II) 41' (1:1); Gregori (II) 52' (2:1) | Summary | 40' (0:1) Haftl; 70' (2:2) Schlecht | Attendance: 800; Referee: (Switzerland) Gerber Bern |

| 24 March 1935 Round 21 | La Chaux-de-Fonds | 4–2 | Basel | Stade Charrière, La Chaux-de-Fonds |
| 15:00 | Wagner (1:0); Wagner (2:0); Wagner (3:0); Berberat (4:1) | Summary | (3:1) Müller (4:2) Haftl | Attendance: 1,200; Referee: (Switzerland) Iseli Biel/Bienne |

| 31 March 1935 Round 22 | Basel | 3–2 | Biel-Bienne | Stadion Schützenmatte, Basel |
| 15:00 | Haftl 25' (1:0); Haftl (2:2); Diethelm (3:2) | Summary | 27' (1:1) Gross (pen. 1:2) Gross | Attendance: 5,000; Referee: (Switzerland) Wittwer Geneva |

| 7 April 1935 Round 23 | Basel | 2–2 | Young Fellows Zürich | Landhof, Basel |
| 13:15 | Jaeck 30' (1:0); Jaeck 50' (pen. 2:0) | Summary | (2:1) Frigerio (2:2) Winkler | Attendance: 5,000; Referee: (Switzerland) Hans Wüthrich Bern |

| 14 April 1935 Round 17 | Locarno | 1–0 | Basel | Stadio del Lido, Locarno |
| | Stalder 45' (1:0) | Summary | | Attendance: 700; Referee: (Switzerland) Iseli Biel/Bienne |

| 28 April 1935 Round 24 | Basel | 1–2 | Concordia Basel | Landhof, Basel |
| 15:00 | Müller 72' (1:2) | Summary | 30' (0:1) Kult; 50' (0:2) Grauer | Attendance: 5,000; Referee: (Switzerland) Wittwer Geneva |

| 12 May 1935 Round 25 | Basel | 3–2 | Servette | Stadion Rankhof, Basel |
| 15:30 | Haftl 25' (1:0); Spichiger (2:0); Spichiger 57' (3:0) | Summary | 62' (3:1) Loichot; 70' (3:2) Guerne | Attendance: 5,000; Referee: (Switzerland) Enderli Winterthur |

| 19 May 1935 Round 26 | Basel | 1–1 | Lugano | Landhof, Basel |
| 15:00 | Haftl 75' (1:1) | Summary | 19' (0:1) Amadò | Attendance: 2.000; Referee: (Switzerland) Hans Wüthrich Bern |

==== League table ====
| Pos | Team | Pld | W | D | L | GF | GA | GD | Pts | Qualification |
|---|---|---|---|---|---|---|---|---|---|---|
| 1 | Lausanne-Sport | 26 | 17 | 7 | 2 | 69 | 28 | +41 | 41 | Champions and Swiss Cup wunners |
| 2 | Servette | 26 | 17 | 6 | 3 | 56 | 28 | +28 | 40 | |
| 3 | Lugano | 26 | 14 | 7 | 5 | 59 | 31 | +28 | 35 | |
| 4 | Grasshopper Club | 26 | 12 | 8 | 6 | 49 | 33 | +16 | 32 | |
| 5 | Basel | 26 | 12 | 4 | 10 | 61 | 50 | +11 | 28 | |
| 6 | FC Bern | 26 | 10 | 7 | 9 | 62 | 43 | +19 | 27 | |
| 7 | Biel-Bienne | 26 | 11 | 5 | 10 | 48 | 41 | +7 | 27 | |
| 8 | Young Fellows Zürich | 26 | 12 | 3 | 11 | 48 | 59 | −11 | 27 | |
| 9 | Locarno | 26 | 10 | 6 | 10 | 45 | 42 | +3 | 26 | |
| 10 | La Chaux-de-Fonds | 26 | 10 | 3 | 13 | 47 | 48 | −1 | 23 | |
| 11 | Nordstern Basel | 26 | 8 | 5 | 13 | 48 | 49 | −1 | 21 | |
| 12 | Young Boys | 26 | 6 | 5 | 15 | 46 | 72 | −26 | 17 | |
| 13 | Concordia Basel | 26 | 5 | 4 | 17 | 36 | 79 | −43 | 14 | Relegated |
| 14 | Etoile Carouge | 26 | 2 | 2 | 22 | 14 | 85 | −71 | 6 | Relegated |

Source: rsssf.com

=== Swiss Cup ===
| 7 October 1934 1st principal round | Bellinzona | 0–1 | Basel | Campo Granata, Bellinzona |
| | | FCB summary | (0:1) Haftl | Attendance: 1,100; Referee: Alfred Spengler (Erlenbach, Switzerland) |
Note: Bellinzona played the 1934/35 season in the 1. Liga (second tier).

| 18 November 1935 Round 2 | Basel | 5–2 | St. Gallen | Landhof, Basel |
| 14:45 | Müller 15' (1:0); Jaeck 30' (2:0); Schlecht 33' (3:0); Jaeck 54' (4:0); Müller 84' (pen 5:1) | FCB summary | 80' (4:1) Cellere; 87' (pen. 5:2) Meier (I) | Attendance: 3,000; Referee: (Switzerland) Rodolphe Wittwer (Geneva) |
Note: St. Gallen played the 1934/35 season in the 1. Liga (second tier).

| 2 December 1934 Round 3 | Basel | 2–0 | Chiasso | Stadion Schützenmatte, Basel |
| 13:00 | Jaeck 70' (pen. 1:0); Hufschmid 80' (2:0) | FCB summary | | Attendance: 4,000; Referee: Alfred Spengler (Erlenbach, Switzerland) |
Note: Chiasso played the 1934/35 season in the 1. Liga (second tier).

| 3 March 1935 Quarter-final | Basel | 5–3 | Lugano | Landhof, Basel |
| 14:30 | Müller 9' (1:0); Schlecht 35' (2:2); Hummel (3:2); Haftl 55' (4:2); Müller (5:3) | FCB summary | 29' (1:1) Amadò; 32' (1:2) Zali; 62' (4:3) Poretti | Attendance: 5,000; Referee: (Switzerland) Hans Enderli (Winterthur) |
Note: Lugano played the 1934/35 season in the Nationalloga (top-tier).

| 22 April 1935 Semi-final | Nordstern Basel | 3–2 | Basel | Stadion Rankhof, Basel |
| 15:00 | Mohler 10' (1:0); Büche 27' (pen. 2:0); Büche 33' (3:0) | FCB summary | 40' (3:0) Jaeck; 60' (pen. 3:2) Jaeck | Attendance: 10,000; Referee: (Switzerland) Hans Enderli (Winterthur) |
Note: Nordstern played the 1934/35 season in the Nationalloga (top-tier).

== See also ==
- History of FC Basel
- List of FC Basel players
- List of FC Basel seasons

== Sources ==
- Rotblau: Jahrbuch Saison 2014/2015. Publisher: FC Basel Marketing AG. ISBN 978-3-7245-2027-6
- Die ersten 125 Jahre. Publisher: Josef Zindel im Friedrich Reinhardt Verlag, Basel. ISBN 978-3-7245-2305-5
- FCB team 1934/35 at fcb-archiv.ch
- Switzerland 1934/35 by Erik Garin at Rec.Sport.Soccer Statistics Foundation
