= 1933–34 FC Basel season =

FC Basel
1933–34 season
- Chairman: Franz Rinderer
- First team coach: Karl Kurz until 26 November 1933 then Josef Haist
- Ground: Landhof, Basel
- Nationalliga: Group Stage: 5th
- Swiss Cup: Quarter-final
- Top goalscorer: League: Otto Haftl (28); All: Otto Haftl (36)
- Highest home attendance: 9,000 on 6 May 1934 vs Young Fellows Zürich
- Lowest home attendance: 1,000 on 24 June 1934 vs FC Bern
- Average home league attendance: 3,833

The FC Basel 1933–34 season was the forty-first season since the club was foundation on 15 November 1893. FC Basel played their home games in the Landhof in the district Wettstein in Kleinbasel. The club chairman Franz Rinderer, who was the president for the third consecutive period.

== Overview ==
The Austrian trainer Karl Kurz remained trainer for his second season and fellow Austrian Josef Haist was co-trainer. Kurz was ill with leukaemia and his condition worsened. He died because of his illness during the evening of 26 November 1933, only hours the team's victory in the away game against Blue Stars Zürich. He was 35 years old. Josef Haist then took over the job as head coach.

Basel played a total of 46 matches in their 1933–34 season. 30 of these matches were in the domestic league Nationalliga, four in the Swiss Cup and 12 were friendly matches. Of these 12 friendlies seven were played in the Landhof, three other games were also played in Switzerland and three were played in France. Of the friendly games, seven ended with a victory and four ended with a defeat.

The 1933–34 Nationalliga was reformed. The top division was no longer divided into two groups, but for the first time, all teams were in one group. The second-tier league remained with two regional groups. The championship was contested by 16 teams and was played in a double round robin, gaining two points for a victory and one for a draw. The three bottom-placed teams would be relegated. Basel started the season well, winning six of the first nine games, suffering only one defeat. Following the death of trainer Kurz the team was disorientated, losing five of the next seven matches and thus losing contact with the two top teams. Then in March Basel caught their form and improved again to finish their Nationalliga season in fifth position in the table, with 15 victories from the 30 games and 36 points. Servette won the championship with 49 points, three points ahead of Grasshopper Club. Urania Genève Sport, FC Blue Stars Zürich and FC Zürich suffered relegation.

In the 1st principal round of the Swiss Cup Basel were drawn at home against and defeated lower tier Solothurn. In the second round away against Lausanne-Sport winning 3–1 and third round at home against local rivals Nordstern Basel winning by three goals to one. Then in the quarter-final on 4 February 1934 Basel were defeated by Locarno and that fits, timely, completely into the entire picture of the seasons evolution. Grasshopper Club won the cup beating Servette 2–0, thanks to an own goal and a goal from Federico Schott.

== Players ==
The following is the list of the Basel first team squad during the season 1933–34. The list includes players that were in the squad the day the season started on 6 August 1933 but subsequently left the club after that date.

Note: Flags indicate national team as defined under FIFA eligibility rules; some limited exceptions apply. Players may hold more than one non-FIFA nationality.

No.	Pos.	Nation	Player
—	GK	SUI	Emil Blattmann
—	GK	SUI	Kurt Imhof
—	DF	SUI	Robert Büchi
—	DF	AUT	Josef Chloupek
—	DF	GER	Hermann Enderlin (II)
—	MF	SUI	Ernst Hufschmid
—	DF	GER	Emil Hummel
—	MF	CZE	Vlastimil Borecký
—	MF	SUI	Hans Greiner
—	MF	SUI	Paul Schaub

No.	Pos.	Nation	Player
—	MF	SUI	Eduard Zuber
—	FW	SUI	Karl Bielser
—	FW	SUI	Adolf Frey
—	FW	AUT	Otto Haftl
—	FW	SUI	Alfred Jaeck
—	FW	SUI	Machow
—	FW	SUI	Walter Müller
—	FW	SUI	Mutter
—	FW	SUI	Alfred Schlecht
—	FW	AUT	Ferdinand Wesely

Players who left the squad

Note: Flags indicate national team as defined under FIFA eligibility rules; some limited exceptions apply. Players may hold more than one non-FIFA nationality.

No.	Pos.	Nation	Player
—	GK	SUI	Paul Blumer
—	GK	SUI	Gerhard Walter
—	DF	SUI	Armando Ardizzoia

No.	Pos.	Nation	Player
—	DF	SUI	Ernst Grauer
—	DF		Paul Heinrich
—	FW	GER	Alfred Enderlin (I)

== Results ==
=== Legend ===
Win Draw Loss Postponed

=== Friendly matches ===
==== Pre-season ====
6 August 1933 Pre-season	RC Strasbourg (France)	2–3	(Switzerland) Basel	Strasbourg
	39' (1:1); Keller 50' (2:1)	Summary	17' (0:1) Haftl; 52' (2:2) Haftl; 60' (2:3) Greiner

13 August 1933 Pre-season	Luzern (Switzerland)	2–4	(Switzerland) Basel	Tribschen, Luzern
	Brönnimann (1x); Treier (1x)	Summary	(2x) Greiner (2x) Meyer	Attendance: 1,200; Referee: (Switzerland) Hans Wüthrich Bern

20 August 1933 Pre-season	Biel-Bienne (Switzerland)	3–2	(Switzerland) Basel	Gurzelen Stadion, Biel/Bienne
	Jennings (1:2); Rahmen (2:2); Rahmen (3:2)	Summary	(0:1) Wesely (0:2) Hufschmid	Attendance: 800; Referee: (Switzerland) Voisard Biel/Bienne

23 August 1933 Pre-season	Kreuzlingen (Switzerland)	2–3	(Switzerland) Basel	Landhof, Basel
	Stadler (1:0); Stadler (2:1)	Summary	30' (1;1) Haftl (2:2) (2:3) Haftl	Attendance: Stadion an der Konstanzerstrasse, Kreuzlingen; Referee: (Switzerland)

==== Mid-season ====
24 September 1932 Mid-season	Basel (Switzerland)	7–0	(Switzerland) Black Stars Basel	Landhof, Basel
	Hufschmid (1:0); Wesely (2:0); Haftl (3:0); Hufschmid (4:0); Hufschmid (5:0); Hufschmid (6:0); Haftl (7:0)	Summary		Attendance: 800; Referee: (Switzerland) Pollitz Basel

19 November 1933 Mid-season	FC Porrentruy (Switzerland)	0–10	(Switzerland) Basel	Porrentruy
		Summary	Goal

3 December 1933 Mid-season	Basel (Switzerland)	3–9	(Hungary) Ferencvárosi TC	Landhof, Basel
14:30	Wesely (1:8); Wesely (2:9); Haftl (3:9)	Summary	6' (0:1) Sárosi; 9' (0:2) Kemény; 23' (0:3) Kemény; 24' (0:4) Toldi; 52' (0:5) Toldi (0:6) Takács (0:7) Kemény; 70' (0:8) Toldi (1:9) Sárosi	Attendance: 3,000; Referee: (Switzerland) Hans Wüthrich Bern

4 March 1934 Mid-season	Metz (France)	2–4	(Switzerland) Basel	Metz
	Goal	Summary	(2x) Hufschmid (1x) Jaeck (1x) Haftl

24 March 1934 Mid-season	Basel (Switzerland)	2–3	(Hungary) 33 FC Budai	Landhof, Basel
16:00	Haftl (1x); Wesely (1x)	Summary	(2x) Remmer (1x) Poszony	Attendance: 1,500; Referee: (Switzerland) H. Neumann Basel

1 April 1934 Mid-season	Valenciennes (France)	v	(Switzerland) Basel	Valenciennes
		[ Summary]

7 April 1934 Mid-season	Basel (Switzerland)	1–7	(West Germany) VfB Leipzig	Landhof, Basel
16:00	Chloupek (pen.)	Summary	(3x) Grosse (2x) Lindemann (2x) Schön	Attendance: 1,800; Referee: (Switzerland) H. Neumann Basel

10 May 1934 Mid-season	Basel (Switzerland)	1–2	(West Germany) Freiburger FC	Stadion Rankhof, Basel
15:45	Haftl 28' (1:1)	Summary	10' (0:1) Reinecke; 90' (o.g. 1:2)	Attendance: 2,500; Referee: (Switzerland) Müry Basel

6 June 1934 Mid-season	Basel (Switzerland)	5–2	(Hungary) Bocskai FC	Landhof, Basel
18:45	Müller 4' (1:0); Clunas 10' (2:0); Jaeck 64' (pen. 3:0); Clunas 65' (4:0); Haftl 75' (5:1)	Summary	(4:1) Vince; 73' (pen. 5:2) Markos	Attendance: 3,000; Referee: (Switzerland) Traub Basel

=== Nationalliga ===
==== Matches ====
27 August 1933 Round 1	Locarno	3–3	Basel	Stadio del Lido, Locarno
	Signorini 17' (1:0); Signorini 36' (2:1); Stalder 50' (3:1)	Summary	32' (1:1) Haftl; 55' (3:2) Wesely; 85' (3:3) Jaeck	Attendance: 800; Referee: (Switzerland) Brüschweiler Zürich

3 September 1933 Round 2	Basel	3–1	Servette	Landhof, Basel
15:15	Schlecht 26' (1:0); Wesely (2:0); Schlecht 75' (3:1)	Summary	50' (2:1) Amdado	Attendance: 6,500; Referee: (Switzerland) Schrumpf Zürich

10 September 1933 Round 3	Basel	3–0	La Chaux-de-Fonds	Landhof, Basel
15:00	Jaeck 47' (1:0); Jaeck 51' (2:0); Schlecht (3:0)	Summary		Attendance: 2,500; Referee: (Switzerland) Wittwer Geneva

8 October 1933 Round 4	Basel	4–1	Concordia Basel	Stadion Rankhof, Basel
13:15	Haftl (3x); Hufschmid (1x)	Summary	(pen.) Faszinek	Attendance: 6,000; Referee: (Switzerland) Fischer Bern

15 October 1933 Round 5	Urania Genève Sport	6–5	Basel	Stade de Frontenex, Geneva
	Neury 6' (1:0); Buchoux 46' (2:3); Zila 49' (3:3); Neury (4:5); Zila (5:5); Drozda (6:5)	Summary	(pen. 1:1) Jaeck; 29' (1:2) Hufschmid; 32' (1:3) Hufschmid; 50' (pen. 3:4) Jaeck; 52' (3:5) Haftl	Attendance: 2,500; Referee: (Switzerland) W. Bangerter La Chaux-de-Fonds

22 October 1933 Round 6	Basel	2–1	Nordstern Basel	Landhof, Basel
15:00	Jaeck (pen. 1:1); Schlecht (2:1)	Summary	(0:1) Szabo	Attendance: 6,000; Referee: (Switzerland) Hans Wüthrich Bern

29 October 1933 Round 7	Basel	4–0	Zürich	Landhof, Basel
15:00	Borecký 24' (1:0); Jaeck 62' (pen. 2:0); Müller 64' (3:0); Schlecht (4:0)	Summary		Attendance: 2,500; Referee: (Switzerland) Sally Rosenbaum Zürich

12 November 1933 Round 8	Young Boys	1–1	Basel	Wankdorf Stadium, Bern
	Schicker 70' (1:1)	Summary	65' (0:1) Jaeck	Attendance: 4,500; Referee: (Switzerland) Brüschweiler Zürich

26 November 1933 Round 9	Blue Stars Zürich	1–5	Basel	Förrlibuck, Zürich
14:45	Kohler (1:5)	Summary	51' (0:1) Jaeck; 60' (0:2) Haftl; 64' (0:3) Hummel; 85' (0:4) Haftl; 86' (0:5) Hummel	Attendance: 2,500; Referee: (Switzerland) Allemann Biel/Bienne

17 December 1933 Round 10	Basel	2–5	Young Fellows Zürich	Landhof, Basel
14:45	Haftl (1:1); Müller (2:3)	Summary	11' (0:1) Snopek; 22' (1:2) Snopek (1:3) Snopek; 75' (2:4) Müller; 83' (2:5) Diebold	Attendance: 2,000; Referee: (Switzerland) Enderli Winterthur

24 December 1933 Round 11	Grasshopper Club	3–0	Basel	Hardturm, Zürich
14:30	Xam 56' (1:0); Trello 58' (2:0); Trello 79' (3:0)	Summary		Attendance: 3,000; Referee: (Switzerland) Schwaar Biel/Bienne

31 December 1933 Round 12	Basel	3–1	Lugano	Landhof, Basel
14:30	Haftl (1:0); Jaeck (2:0); Jaeck (3:0)	Summary	72' (3:1) Gilardoni	Attendance: 4,000; Referee: (Switzerland) Spengler Olten

7 January 1934 Round 13	Biel-Bienne	8–1	Basel	Gurzelen Stadion, Biel/Bienne
	Grünfeld 20' (1:0); Karcher 25' (2:0); Fascinek (3:0) von Känel (4:0); Fascinek (5:1); Binder (pen. 6:1); Rahmen (7:1); Karcher (8:1)	Summary	(4:1) Jaeck	Attendance: 1,500; Referee: (Switzerland) Schrumpf Zürich

14 January 1934 Round 14	Lausanne-Sport	2–2	Basel	Olympique de la Pontaise, Lausanne
14:30	Spagnoli (1x); Jäggi (IV) (1x)	Summary	(1x) Schlecht (1x) Haftl	Attendance: 4,000; Referee: (Switzerland) W. Bangerter La Chaux-de-Fonds

21 January 1934 Round 15	FC Bern	3–2	Basel	Neufeld, Bern
	Townley 30' (1:0); Bösch (2:0); Bösch (3:1)	Summary	(2:1) Haftl; 89' (3:2) Haftl	Attendance: 4,000; Referee: (Switzerland) Meyer Lausanne

Round 16	Basel	A–A	Locarno	Landhof, Basel
		[ Summary]
Note: Abandoned, with the score at 2–1, due to bad weather. Replayed in March

18 February 1934 Round 17	Servette	3–2	Basel	Charmilles Stadium, Geneva
14:45	Tax 46' (1:2); Passello 75' (2:2); Kielholz 85' (3:2)	Summary	25' (0:1) Jaeck (0:2) Wesely	Attendance: 4,000; Referee: (Switzerland) Hans Wüthrich Bern

25 February 1934 Round 18	La Chaux-de-Fonds	2–2	Basel	Stade Charrière, La Chaux-de-Fonds
14:30	Grünfeld 5' (1:0); Volentik (I) (2:2)	Summary	6' (1:1) Hufschmid (1:2) Hufschmid	Attendance: 2,000; Referee: (Switzerland) Allemann Biel/Bienne

11 March 1934 Round 16	Basel	7–1	Locarno	Landhof, Basel
14:30	Haftl (1:0); Haftl (2:0); Müller 45' (3:0); Haftl (4:0) (o.g. 5:1); Wesely (6:1); Haftl (7:1)	Summary	(4:1) Pinter	Attendance: 2,500; Referee: (Switzerland) Enderli Winterthur

Round 19	Concordia Basel	P–P	Basel	Stadion Schützenmatte, Basel
		[ Summary]
Note: Played on 15 April.

Round 20	Basel	P–P	Urania Genève Sport	Landhof, Basel
		[ Summary]
Note: Played on 8 April

18 March 1934 Round 21	Nordstern Basel	1–4	Basel	Stadion Rankhof, Basel
15:00	Büche (1:1)	Summary	12' (0:1) Hufschmid; 29' (1:2); 80' (o.g. 1:3) (1:4) Haftl	Attendance: 7,000; Referee: (Switzerland) Spengler Olten

8 April 1934 Round 20	Basel	2–2	Urania Genève Sport	Landhof, Basel
15:00	Schlecht 5' (1:0); Müller 44' (2:2)	Summary	28' (1:1) Buchoux; 41' (1:2) Campana	Attendance: 3,500; Referee: (Switzerland) Mercet Locarno

15 April 1934 Round 19	Concordia Basel	0–3	Basel	Stadion Schützenmatte, Basel
15:00		Summary	7' (1:0) Schlecht; 10' (0:2) Greiner; 68' (0:3) Greiner	Attendance: 5,000; Referee: (Switzerland) Hans Wüthrich Bern

22 April 1934 Round 22	Zürich	2–4	Basel	Hardturm, Zürich
14:00	Baumeister 3' (1:0); Cay 25' (2:2)	Summary	20' (1:1) Schlecht; 52' (1:2) (2:3) Müller; 89' (2:4) Haftl	Attendance: 4,000; Referee: (Switzerland) Meyer Lausanne

Round 23	Basel	P–P	Young Boys	Landhof, Basel
		[ Summary]
Note: Played at the end of the season

29 April 1934 Round 27	Lugano	3–2	Basel	Campo Marzio, Lugano
	Amado 50' (1:1); Kovacz 55' (2:1); Donizetti (3:1)	Summary	25' (0:1) Schlecht; 75' (3:2) Jaeck	Attendance: 3.000; Referee: (Switzerland) Mercet Locarno

1 May 1934 Round 28	Basel	6–2	Biel-Bienne	Landhof, Basel
15:00	Wesely 12' (1:0); Haftl 46' (2:1); Hufschmid 49' (3:1); Haftl 54' (pen 4:1); Wesely 70' (5:1); Haftl (6:2)	Summary	30' (1:1) Karcher; 52' Rahmen	Attendance: 3,000; Referee: (Switzerland) Enderli Winterthur

6 May 1934 Round 24	Basel	8–2	Blue Stars Zürich	Landhof, Basel
13:1	Haftl 17' (1:0); Haftl 30' (2:0); Schlecht (3:0); Müller (4:0); Haftl 51' (5:0); Hufschmid 53' (6:0); Müller 54' (7:0); Haftl 68' (8:1)	Summary	55' (7:1) Schmid; 80' (8:2) Suter	Attendance: 9,000; Referee: (Switzerland) Rapin Lausanne

15 May 1934 Round 25	Young Fellows Zürich	2–0	Basel	Förrlibuck, Zürich
15:45	Cabrini 65' (1:0); Frigerio 70' (pen. 2:0)	Summary		Attendance: 2,000; Referee: (Switzerland) Dagon Solothurn

19 May 1934 Round 26	Basel	1–2	Grasshopper Club	Landhof, Basel
17:00	Jaeck 65' (1:1)	Summary	43' (0:1) Rohr; 70' (pen. 1:2) Trello	Attendance: 5,000; Referee: (Switzerland) Wittwer Geneva

17 June 1934 Round 29	Basel	2–2	Lausanne-Sport	Stadion Rankhof, Basel
13:30	Schlecht 30' (1:1); Wesely 35' (2:1)	Summary	5' (0:1) Spagnoli; 48' (o.g. 2:2) Hummel	Attendance: 2,000; Referee: (Switzerland) Hans Wüthrich Bern

24 June 1934 Round 30	Basel	3–2	FC Bern	Landhof, Basel
15:00	Jaeck (pen. 1:2); Wesely (2:2); Jaeck (3:2)	Summary	(0:1) Kipp (0:2) Bossi	Attendance: 1,000; Referee: (Switzerland) Iseli Biel/Bienne

30 June 1934 Round 23	Basel	3–2	Young Boys	Landhof, Basel
17:00	Müller (1_1); Haftl 66' (2:2); Schlecht 75' (3:2)	Summary	(0:1) Hediger; 57' (1:2) Hediger	Attendance: 2,000; Referee: (Switzerland) Meyer Lausanne

==== Table ====
Pos	Team	Pld	W	D	L	GF	GA	GD	Pts	Qualification
1	Servette FC Genève	30	24	1	5	100	29	+71	49	Swiss Champions
2	Grasshopper Club Zürich	30	20	6	4	100	39	+61	46	Swiss Cup winners
3	FC Lugano	30	17	4	9	69	47	+22	38	
4	FC Bern	30	16	6	8	81	63	+18	38	
5	FC Basel	30	15	6	9	89	64	+25	36	
6	Lausanne Sports	30	15	5	10	89	67	+22	35	
7	FC Biel	30	14	4	12	78	68	+10	32	
8	FC Nordstern Basel	30	13	5	12	57	66	−9	31	
9	BSC Young Boys	30	13	4	13	73	65	+8	30	
10	FC Concordia Basel	30	11	5	14	64	71	−7	27	
11	FC Locarno	30	11	5	14	57	66	−9	27	
12	Young Fellows Zürich	30	11	3	16	54	74	−20	25	
13	FC La Chaux-de-Fonds	30	10	3	17	46	78	−32	23	
14	Urania Genève Sport	30	8	6	16	57	85	−28	22	Relegated
15	FC Blue Stars Zürich	30	3	5	22	37	100	−63	11	Relegated
16	FC Zürich	30	4	2	24	27	96	−69	10	Relegated

Source: rsssf.com

=== Swiss Cup ===
1 October 1933 1st principal round	Basel	8–0	Solothurn	Landhof, Basel
15:00	Haftl (1:0); Jaeck (2:0); Schlecht (3:0); Müller 35' (4:0); Haftl (5:0); Jaeck (pen. 6:0); Hufschmid 75' (7:0); Hufschmid (8:0)	FCB summary		Attendance: 2,500; Referee: (Switzerland) William Bangerter (La Chaux-de-Fonds)
Note: Solothurn played the 1933/34 season in the 1. Liga (second tier).

5 November 1933 Round 2	Lausanne-Sport	1–3	Basel	Stade de la Pontaise, Lausanne
14:30	Spagnoli 70' (1:2)	Summary	60' (0:1) Haftl; 65' (0:2) Wesely; 80' (1:3) Müller	Attendance: 3,000; Referee: Alfred Spengler (Erlenbach, Switzerland)
Note: Lausanne-Sport played the 1933/34 season in the Nationalliga (top-tier).

10 December 1933 Round 3	Basel	3–1	Nordstern Basel	Landhof, Basel
14:30	Haftl 42' (1:1); Haftl (2:1); Haftl 78' (3:1)	FCB summary	26' (0:1) Clunas	Attendance: 6,000; Referee: (Switzerland) Rodolphe Wittwer (Geneva)
Note: Nordstern played the 1933/34 season in the Nationalliga (top-tier).

4 February 1934 Quarter-final	Basel	3–4 (a.e.t.)	Locarno	Landhof, Basel
14:30	Jaeck 40' (1:2); Haftl 50' (2:2); Haftl 57' (3:2)	Summary	26' (0:1) Pomi; 32' (0:2) Pinter; 80' (3:3) Cavalli; 107' (3:4) Pinter	Attendance: 3,500; Referee: (Switzerland) Rodolphe Wittwer (Geneva)
Note: Locarno played the 1933/34 season in the Nationalliga (top-tier).

== See also ==
- History of FC Basel
- List of FC Basel players
- List of FC Basel seasons

== Sources ==
- Rotblau: Jahrbuch Saison 2014/2015. Publisher: FC Basel Marketing AG. ISBN 978-3-7245-2027-6
- Die ersten 125 Jahre. Publisher: Josef Zindel im Friedrich Reinhardt Verlag, Basel. ISBN 978-3-7245-2305-5
- FCB team 1933–34 at fcb-archiv.ch
