= 1931–32 FC Basel season =

FC Basel
1931–32 season
- Chairman: Franz Rinderer
- First team coach: Gustav Putzendopler; Otto Haftl
- Ground: Landhof, Basel
- Nationalliga: Group Stage: 7th
- Swiss Cup: Semi-final
- Top goalscorer: League: Otto Haftl (11); All: Otto Haftl (15)
- Highest home attendance: 8,000 on 3 April 1932 vs Nordstern Basel
- Lowest home attendance: 1,500 on 11 October 1931 vs La Chaux-de-Fonds
- Average home league attendance: 3,937

The FC Basel 1931–32 season was their thirty ninth season since the club's foundation on 15 November 1893. FC Basel played their home games in the Landhof in the district Wettstein in Kleinbasel. The club's new chairman Franz Rinderer, who took over the presidency from Otto Kuhn at the AGM on 11 July 1931.

== Overview ==
Last season's coach/manager Austrian Gustav Putzendopler stayed on for his second season as trainer. Fellow Austrian international Otto Haftl signed in from AC Sparta Prague to the team becoming Basel's first ever fully professional football player. During his first season at the club he also acted as player-manager after Putzendopler laid down the job as trainer. The team played a total of 35 matches in their 1931–32 season. 16 of these matches were in the domestic league, six matches in the Swiss Cup and 13 games were friendly matches. Of these 13 friendlies four were played in the Landhof, six other games were also played in Switzerland. Only one was played in Germany against FV Lörrach and another one was played in France against CA Mulhouse. Of the friendly games, ten games ended with a victory, two were drawn and one match ended with a defeat.

The previous season the top tier of Swiss football had three regional groups each with 11 teams. The number of teams was reduced from 33 to 18, which meant that 15 teams were relegated. The newly formed and renamed domestic league, now Nationalliga, started at the end of August. The new 1931–32 Nationalliga was now divided into two groups, each with nine teams, coming from the whole of Switzerland and no longer just regional groups. The top team in each group would advance to the finals. The two second placed teams would have a play-off to decide the third final place and the curiosity this season the second tier champions would also qualify to the finals. Basel were allocated to Group 1. The league season started very badly, they lost their first five games straight off, conceding 27 goals. Not only did Basel change their trainer, but they also changed their goalkeeper and various players. In the second half of the season things improved and with six victories in the last seven games Basel were able to rise from the foot of the table. They finished the season four points above the relegation zone. FC Bern and St. Gallen were relegated from this group, Étoile-Sporting and Old Boys from the other group.

Zürich were group 1 winners and as second placed Urania Genève Sport won the play-off against Biel-Bienne, these two teams advanced to the finals with group 2 winners Grasshopper Club. As mentioned the second tier champions were also qualified for the finals, this being Lausanne-Sport. After the four teams had each played their three games, Zürich and Lausanne were then level, each with four points and a play-off decided the championship. The curiosity that a second-tier team would become Swiss champions happened, because Lausanne won the play-off 5–2.

In the 1st principal round of the Swiss Cup Basel were drawn away against and defeated lower classed SC Veltheim. They needed a reply in the second round to beat Lugano and were victorious against lower classed SC Brühl St. Gallen in the third round. Then a quarter-final victory over La Chaux-de-Fonds took the team into a semi-final against Grasshopper Club. However this ended with a rather hefty defeat 1–8 and that fits completely into the picture of a rather disappointing season. The Grasshoppers won the final 5–1 against Urania Genève Sport

An episode that is noted in association with the Cup, was the second-round replay away against FC Lugano on 22 November 1931. The mood amongst the 3,000 spectators was heated even before the kick-off. This because after the 3–3 draw in the first game; the local press had circulated the most incredible rumours. Then, Basel's Alfred Schlecht scored the winning goal early, not even two minutes after the game had started. However, shortly before the end of the match referee Hans Wüthrich did not blow his whistle and award a penalty after an alleged handball by a Basel player. The referee ended the game shortly afterwards with a Basel victory and the ill tempers were worsened. After the game there were tumults and riots among the spectators who were not satisfied with the referee's performance. Stones were thrown at referee and players and the windows of the changing rooms were smashed. It was some eight hours later, before things were settled enough, for the police to able to bring both the referee and the entire Basel team to safety, by ship over Lake Lugano. According to the reports in the club chronicles, quite a few players were injured. Josef Remay had a bleeding head, Hermann Enderlin had a hole above his eye, Leopold Kielholz and goalkeeper Paul Blumer were also hurt.

== Players ==
Squad members

Note: Flags indicate national team as defined under FIFA eligibility rules; some limited exceptions apply. Players may hold more than one non-FIFA nationality.

No.	Pos.	Nation	Player
—	GK	SUI	Paul Blumer
—	GK	TCH	Ferdinand Klemm
—	GK	HUN	Ferenc Plattko
—	GK	SUI	Gerhard Walter
—	DF	SUI	Armando Ardizzoia
—	DF	FRG	Hermann Enderlin (II)
—	DF	SUI	Ernst Grauer
—	MF	SUI	Ernst Hufschmid
—	MF	FRG	Emil Hummel
—	DF	HUN	Josef Remay
—	DF	SUI	Ernst Weber
—	MF	CZE	Vlastimil Borecký
—	MF	SUI	Max Galler (II)

No.	Pos.	Nation	Player
—	MF	SUI	Giovanni Lupi
—	MF	SUI	Paul Schaub
—	FW	SUI	Karl Bielser
—	FW	SUI	Eduard Buser
—	FW	FRG	Alfred Enderlin (I)
—	FW	SUI	Adolf Frey
—	FW	AUT	Otto Haftl
—	FW	SUI	August Hiss
—	FW	SUI	Alfred Jaeck
—	FW	SUI	Leopold Kielholz
—	FW	CZE	Josef Kratochvil
—	FW	SUI	Walter Müller
—	FW	SUI	Alfred Schlecht
—	FW	POL	Leopold Wionsowsky

Players who left the squad

Note: Flags indicate national team as defined under FIFA eligibility rules; some limited exceptions apply. Players may hold more than one non-FIFA nationality.

No.	Pos.	Nation	Player
—	GK	SUI	Traugott Märki
—	GK	SUI	Hans Nikles
—	GK	SUI	Ernst Zorzotti
—	MF	SUI	Otto Meier

No.	Pos.	Nation	Player
—	MF	SUI	Walter Notz
—	MF	SUI	Emil Riedener
—	FW	NOR	Jørgen Juve
—		SUI	Hector Fisher
—			Fritz Griesbaum

== Results ==
=== Legend ===
Win Draw Loss Postponed

=== Friendly matches ===
==== Pre- and mid-season ====
16 August 1931 Pre-season	FC Liestal (Switzerland)	2–3	(Switzerland) Basel	Liestal
	Casartelli 8' (1:0); Soverini (2:0)	Summary	(2:1) (2:2); 89' (2:3)

23 August 1931 Pre-season	Aarau (Switzerland)	1–3	(Switzerland) Basel	Stadion Brügglifeld, Aarau
	Taddei	Summary	(1x) Kielholz (1x) Müller (1x) Schlecht	Attendance: 500; Referee: (Switzerland) Reber Baden

20 September 1931 Mid-season	FV Lörrach (West Germany)	1–1	(Switzerland) Basel	Lörrach
	(1:0)	Summary	(o.g. 1:1)

==== Winter break ====
26 December 1931 Winter break	CA Mulhouse (France)	1–3	(Switzerland) Basel	Mulhouse
	Goal	Summary	Goal

1 January 1932 Winter break	Basel (Switzerland)	3–4	(West Germany) Freiburger FC	Landhof, Basel
14:30	10' (o.g.); Schlecht 18' (2:0); Borecký (3:1)	Summary	(2:1) Peters; 49' (3:2) Peters; 50' (3:3) Peters; 52' (3:4) Fehrle	Referee: (Switzerland) Karl Wunderlin Basel

17 January 1932 Winter break	FC Olten (Switzerland)	0–4	(Switzerland) Basel	Olten
		Summary	Goal

30 January 1932 Mid-season	Basel (Switzerland)	4–0	(Switzerland) Old Boys	Landhof, Basel
	Haftl 7' (1:0); Hiss 35' (2:0); Enderlin (I) (pen. 3:0); Hiss 67' (4:0)	Summary		Attendance: 800; Referee: (Switzerland) Hubert Basel

5 March 1932 Mid-season	Basel XI (Switzerland)	2–8	(Switzerland) Basel	Landhof, Basel
	Goal	Summary	Goal

20 March 1932 Mid-season	Luzern (Switzerland)	2–7	(Switzerland) Basel	Luzern
	Goal	Summary	(2x) Enderlin (I) (2x) Hiss (2x) Haftl (1x) Wionsowsky	Attendance: 1,200; Referee: (Switzerland) Martin Luzern

27 March 1932 Mid-season	Freiburger FC (Switzerland)	2–3	(Switzerland) Basel	Freiburg
	Goal	Summary	Goal

28 March 1932 Mid-season	Young Boys (Switzerland)	3–4	(Switzerland) Basel	Wankdorf Stadium, Bern
	O'Neill 40' (1:0); O'Neill (pen. 2:2); Siegrist (pen. 3:2)	Summary	42' (1:1) Kielholz; 50' (1:2) Kielholz (3:3) Borecký; 88' (3:4) Jaeck	Attendance: 2,500; Referee: Gerber

1 May 1932 Mid-season	Basel (Switzerland)	6–2	(West Germany) Karlsruher FV	Landhof, Basel
15:00	Haftl 15' (1:0); Jaeck (2:2); Kielholz (3:2); Haftl (4:2); Kielholz (5:2); Hufschmid (pen. 6:2)	Summary	17' (1:1) Link; 20' (1:2) Schneider	Attendance: 2,500; Referee: (Switzerland) Felix Herren Basel

22 May 1932 Mid-season	Basel (Switzerland)	3–3	(Switzerland) Servette	Landhof, Basel
15:00	Jaeck (1:1); Kielholz 60' (2:1); Kielholz 75' (3:1)	Summary	6' (0:1) Passello (3:2) Passello (3:3) Kaiser	Referee: (Switzerland) Speidel Basel

=== Nationalliga ===
==== Group 1 results ====
30 August 1931 Round 1	Basel	1–4	Young Fellows Zürich	Landhof, Basel
15:00	Wionsowsky (1:2)	Summary	28' (0:1) Diebold (0:2) Martin (1:3) Meier (1:4) Diebold	Attendance: 2,500; Referee: (Switzerland) Allemann Biel/Bienne

6 September 1931 Round 2	Lugano	8–1	Basel	Campo Marzio, Lugano
	Ranz (1:1); Costa (2:1); Costa (3:1); Ranz (4:1); Costa (5:1); Sturzi (6:1); Sturzi (7:1); Poretti (8:1)	Summary	5' (0:1) Grauer	Attendance: 2,500; Referee: (Switzerland) Paschoud Bern

27 September 1931 Round 3	Basel	0–6	Urania Genève Sport	Landhof, Basel
15:00		Summary	(4x) Chabanel (1x) Stalder (1x) Ross	Attendance: 4,000; Referee: (Switzerland) Dagon Solothurn

10 October 1931 Round 4	Basel	2–5	La Chaux-de-Fonds	Landhof, Basel
15:00	Schlecht 18' (1:0); Schlecht (2:3)	Summary	(1:1) Haefeli (1:2) Haefeli; 47' (1:3) Guerne (2:4) Grimm (2:5) Guerne	Attendance: 1,500; Referee: (Switzerland) Schrumpf Zürich

25 October 1931 Round 5	Zürich	4–1	Basel	Letzigrund, Zürich
15:00	Righetti 19' (1:0); Righetti 78' (2:1); Bösch 86' (3:1); Righetti (4:1)	Summary	(1:1) Hiss	Attendance: 2,500; Referee: (Switzerland) Enderli Winterthur

8 November 1931 Round 6	St. Gallen	2–4	Basel	Espenmoos, St. Gallen
	Mac Pherson (1:0); Mac Pherson (2:1)	Summary	(1:1) Kielholz (2:2) Kielholz (pen. 2:3) Enderlin (I) (2:4) Haftl	Attendance: 2,500; Referee: (Switzerland) Osterwalder Bern

15 November 1931 Round 7	Nordstern Basel	2–0	Basel	Stadion Rankhof, Basel
14:30	Kühm 13' (1:0); Büche 65' (2:0)	Summary		Attendance: 4,500; Referee: (Switzerland) W. Bangerter La Chaux-de-Fonds

6 December 1931 Round 8	Basel	2–2	FC Bern	Landhof, Basel
14:30	Haftl 4' (1:0); Haftl 89' (2:2)	Summary	(pen. 1:1) Townley; 88' (1:2) Schärer	Attendance: 2,500; Referee: (Switzerland) Enderli Winterthur

24 January 1932 Round 9	Basel	0–3	Zürich	Landhof, Basel
14:30		Summary	30' (1:0) Holenstein; 32' (2:0) Lehmann (3:0) Righetti	Attendance: 4,000; Referee: (Switzerland) Ruoff Bern

14 February 1932 Round 10	FC Bern	3–4	Basel	Neufeld, Bern
	Schärer (1:3); Riva 50' (2:3); Townley 55' (3:3)	Summary	1' (0:1) Wionsowsky; 33' (0:2) Hiss; 38' (0:3) Wionsowsky; 59' (3:4) Haftl	Attendance: 1,500; Referee: (Switzerland) Enderli Winterthur

21 February 1932 Round 11	Young Fellows Zürich	0–4	Basel	Förrlibuck, Zürich
14:45		Summary	5' (0:1) Müller (pen. 0:2) Kielholz; 11' (0:3) Müller; 20' (0:4) Müller	Attendance: 3,000; Referee: (Switzerland) Meyer Lausanne

28 February 1932 Round 12	Basel	3–2	St. Gallen	Landhof, Basel
	Kielholz 52' (1:1); Müller 57' (2:1); Haftl 86' (3:2)	Summary	25' (0:1) Hautle (2:2) Hintermann	Attendance: 4,500; Referee: (Switzerland) Mercet Locarno

3 April 1932 Round 13	Basel	3–1	Nordstern Basel	Landhof, Basel
15:00	Müller (1:0); Haftl (2:0); Hiss (3:1)	Summary	(pen. 2:1) Büche	Attendance: 8,000; Referee: (Switzerland) Osterwalder Bern

10 April 1932 Round 14	Urania Genève Sport	4–1	Basel	Stade de Frontenex, Geneva
	Jäggi IV 18' (1:1); Jäggi IV 29' (2:1); Jäggi IV (3:1); Zila (4:1)	Summary	3' (0:1) Jaeck	Attendance: 3,000; Referee: (Switzerland) Allemann Biel/Bienne

17 April 1932 Round 15	La Chaux-de-Fonds	2–6	Basel	Stade Charrière, La Chaux-de-Fonds
15:00	Haefeli 4' (1:0); Sandoz (pen. 2:1)	Summary	(1:1) Schlecht (2:2) Müller (2:3) Haftl (2:4) Haftl (2:5) Haftl (2:6) Müller	Attendance: 2,500; Referee: (Switzerland) Wittwer Geneva

8 May 1932 Round 16	Basel	3–0	Lugano	Landhof, Basel
15:00	Schlecht 40' (1:0); Haftl 74' (2:0); Haftl 88' (3:0)	Summary		Attendance: 4,500; Referee: (Switzerland) Wittwer Geneva

==== Group 1 table ====
Pos	Team	Pld	W	D	L	GF	GA	GD	Pts	Qualification
1	Zürich	16	13	0	3	44	17	+27	26	Group winners / Advance to finals
2	Urania Genève Sport	16	9	1	6	34	24	+10	19	Play-off against second Group 2
3	Young Fellows Zürich	16	8	2	6	44	36	+8	18	
4	Lugano	16	7	3	6	31	22	+9	17	
5	Nordstern Basel	16	7	2	7	28	35	−7	16	
6	La Chaux-de-Fonds	16	7	1	8	35	34	+1	15	
7	Basel	16	7	1	8	35	48	−13	15	
8	FC Bern	16	4	3	9	28	43	−15	11	Relegated
9	St. Gallen	16	2	3	11	35	55	−20	7	Relegated

Source: rsssf.com

=== Swiss Cup ===
4 October 1931 First principal round	SC Veltheim (Winterthur)	1–5	Basel	Schützenwiese, Winterthur
	Eisenring	FCB summary	(2x) Hiss (1x) Hufschmid (1x) Schlecht (1x) Hummel	Attendance: 1,800; Referee: (Switzerland) Hans Bollinger (Schaffhausen)
Note: Veltheim played the 1931/32 season in the 2. Liga (third tier).

1 November 1932 Second round	Basel	3–3 (a.e.t.)	Lugano	Landhof, Basel
14:40	Enderlin (I) 47' (1:3); Haftl 75' (2:3); Hufschmid 80' (3:3)	Summary	5' (0:1) Lestina; 14' (0:2) Ranzi; 20' (0:3) Poretti	Attendance: 5,000; Referee: (Switzerland) Schrumpf (Zürich)
Note: Both teams played the 1931/32 season in the Nationalliga (top-tier).

22 November 1931 Replay	Lugano	0–1	Basel	Campo Marzio, Lugano
14:00		FCB summary	2' (0:1) Schlecht	Attendance: 3,000; Referee: (Switzerland) Hans Wüthrich Bern

13 December 1931 Third round	SC Brühl St. Gallen	1–4	Basel	Krontal, St. Gallen
	Joseph (1:5)	Summary	22' (0:1) Müller (0:2) Haftl; 60' (0:3) Müller; 78' (0:4) Kielholz	Attendance: 2,000; Referee: (Switzerland) Ernst Brüschweiler (Zürich)
Note: Brühl played the 1931/32 season in the 1. Liga (second tier).

7 February 1932 Quarter-final	Basel	6–3	La Chaux-de-Fonds	Landhof, Basel
14:30	Haftl 24' (1:0); Haftl 32' (2:0); Müller 36' (3:0); Hiss 40' (4:0); Kielholz (5:1); Kielholz (6:2)	FCB summary	55' (4:1) Ducommun; 73' (5:2) Grimm; 88' (6:3) Romy	Attendance: 3,000; Referee: (Switzerland) Ernest Meyer (Lausanne)
Note: La Chaux-de-Fonds played the 1931/32 season in the Nationalliga (top-tier).

13 March 1932 Semi-final	Basel	1–8	Grasshopper Club	Landhof, Basel
15:00	Jaeck 18' (pen 1:2)	FCB summary	8' (0:1) Adam; 10' (0:2) Hitrec; 20' (1:3) Max Abegglen; 40' (1:4) Hitrec; 70' (1:5) Hitrec; 75' (1:6) A. Abegglen; 79' (1:7) Hitrec; 85' (1:8) Živković	Attendance: 9,000; Referee: (Switzerland) Osterwalder Bern
Note: GC played the 1931/32 season in the Nationalliga (top-tier).

== See also ==
- History of FC Basel
- List of FC Basel players
- List of FC Basel seasons

== Sources ==
- Rotblau: Jahrbuch Saison 2014/2015. Publisher: FC Basel Marketing AG. ISBN 978-3-7245-2027-6
- Die ersten 125 Jahre. Publisher: Josef Zindel im Friedrich Reinhardt Verlag, Basel. ISBN 978-3-7245-2305-5
- FCB team 1931–32 at fcb-archiv.ch
- Switzerland 1931–32 at RSSSF
