= August Hiss =

Swiss footballer

Personal information
- Full name: August Hiss
- Place of birth: Switzerland
- Position: Striker

Senior career*
| Years | Team | Apps | (Gls) |
| 1931–1932 | FC Basel | 9 | (3) |
- * Club domestic league appearances and goals

August Hiss was a Swiss footballer who played one season for FC Basel. He played in the position as striker.

Hiss joined Basel's first team before the 1931–32 season and made his domestic league debut for the club in the home game at the Landhof on 27 September 1931 as Basel lost 0–6 against Urania Genève Sport. He scored his first goal for his club on 25 October in the away game against Zürich. But his goal could not save Basel from a 4–1 defeat.

In that season Hiss played a total of 18 games for Basel scoring a total of 10 goals. Nine of these games were in the Swiss Serie A, three in the Swiss Cup and six were friendly games. He scored three goal in the domestic league, three in the cup competition and the other four were scored during the test games.

An episode that is noted in association with the Swiss Cup, was the second-round replay away against FC Lugano on 22 November 1931. The mood amongst the 3,000 spectators was heated even before the kick-off. This because after the 3–3 draw in the first game; the local press had circulated the most incredible rumours. Then, Basel's Alfred Schlecht scored the winning goal early, not even two minutes after the game had started. However, shortly before the end of the match referee Hans Wüthrich did not blow his whistle and award a penalty after an alleged handball by a Basel player. The referee ended the game shortly afterwards with a Basel victory and the ill tempers were worsened. After the game there were tumults and riots among the spectators who were not satisfied with the referee's performance. Stones were thrown at referee and players and the windows of the changing rooms were smashed. It was some eight hours before things were settled enough for the police to able to bring both the referee and the entire Basel team to safety, by ship over Lake Lugano. According to the reports in the club chronicles, quite a few players were injured. Josef Remay had a bleeding head, Hermann Enderlin had a hole above his eye, Leopold Kielholz and goalkeeper Paul Blumer were also hurt. Hiss escaped unhurt. Lugano was sanctioned and had to play their next home games at least 100 kilometers from their home ground.
