= 1932–33 FC Basel season =

FC Basel
1932–33 season
- Chairman: Franz Rinderer
- Manager: Karl Kurz
- Ground: Landhof, Basel
- Nationalliga: 2nd in Group 1
- Challenge National: 5th in Group 1
- Swiss Cup: Winners
- Top goalscorer: League: Otto Haftl (17); All: Otto Haftl (28)
- Highest home attendance: 14,000 on 30 April 1933 vs Grasshopper Club
- Lowest home attendance: 3,000 on 19 February 1933 vs La Chaux-de-Fonds and on 19 March 1933 vs Young Fellows Zürich
- Average home league attendance: 6,000

The 1932–33 season was the Fussball Club Basel 1893's 40th season in their existence and their 33rd consecutive season in the top flight of Swiss football. They played their home games in the Landhof in the district Wettstein in Kleinbasel. The club's chairman Franz Rinderer was confirmed at the AGM for the second consecutive period.

== Overview ==
At the beginning of the season the Austrian former international Karl Kurz was appointed as new head coach. The previous season Kunz had been head coach for FC Grenchen. He took over as club trainer from player-manager Otto Haftl who continued with the team as player. Basel played a total of 39 matches in their 1932–33 season. 15 of these matches were in the domestic league Nationalliga, seven in the Challenge National, six matches in the Swiss Cup and 11 matches were friendlies. Of these 11 friendly matches seven were played in the Landhof, two other games were also played in Switzerland and two were played in a tournament in Luxembourg. Of the friendly games, six games ended with a victory, one was drawn and four matches ended with a defeat. The team scored 42 goals and conceded 27.

In the middle of 36th National championships there was an intermediate championship called Challenge National (Championnat intermédiaire). The competition participants were divided into two groups, with encounters between the two groups taking place among themselves. The winners of both groups were to play the final. The games were played in the winter months between November and February. Basel were allocated to group 1 Basel and finished in fifth position, however the away match against Blue Stars Zürich was not played. Basel won three of their seven games drawing and losing twice. Group 1 was won by Grasshopper Club but the Challenge National championship was won by the BSC Young Boys.

Same situation as the previous season in the 36th Swiss championship 1932–33 Nationalliga was also divided into two groups. This year with eight teams in each group, coming from the whole of Switzerland and no longer just regional groups. The top team in each group would advance to the finals. The two second placed teams would have a play-off to decide the third final place and, same curiosity as the previous season, the second tier champions would also qualify to the finals. In this competition the teams played a double round robin. In the first stage the games were played between August and November the remaining between February and May. Basel were allocated to Group 1 and finished in second position in the table, with seven victories and four draws from 14 games. With 18 points they were five behind group winner Grasshopper Club who advanced with group 2 winners Young Boys to the finals. Etoile Carouge finished in last position in the group and suffered relegation. Second tier (1st League) champions were FC Bern and they also advanced to the finals. The cross-over play-off game between the second placed teams from each group was played in Basel in the Stadion Rankhof. But Basel lost 3–4 against Servette, despite the fact that Otto Haftl scored a hat-trick. As last team Servette advanced to the finals, which they finished level on points with Grasshoppers. Servette won the play-off match between these two teams and became champions.

In the Swiss Cup first round Basel were drawn at home in the Landhof against local team Concordia Basel, who in the meantime had been relegated to the third highest league. Basel won 4–2 and advanced to the next round. They played and won 3–0 at home against Blue Stars Zürich. In the third round Basel played away against AC Bellinzona and won 2–3 after extra time. The quarter-final was played at home against Lugano and was won 4–2. In the semi-final Basel were drawn with a home match against Lausanne-Sport. In another high scoring game Basel managed a 5–3 victory. Basel advanced to the Final, which was played in the Hardturm in Zürich. Twice Haftl, once Jaeck and once Walter Müller scored the goals as Basel won the final 4–3. This was their first ever national title, apart from the Anglo-Cup in 1913 which was a forerunner to the Swiss Cup.

The team scored 91 goals, excluding the friendly games, and conceded 62. Haftl was the team's top goal scorer, 17 in the league, 4 in the intermediate and 7 in the cup, in total 28 goals. Ferdinand Wesely was second best goal scorer, 9 in the league, 2 in the intermediate and 7 in the cup, in total 16 goals. Equal third were Alfred Jaeck (4/8/3) and Ernst Hufschmid (10/2/3) both with 15 goals.

== Players ==
The following is the list of the Basel first team squad during the season 1932–33. The list includes players that were in the squad the day the season started on 7 August 1932 but subsequently left the club after that date.

Note: Flags indicate national team as defined under FIFA eligibility rules; some limited exceptions apply. Players may hold more than one non-FIFA nationality.

| No. | Pos. | Nation | Player |
|---|---|---|---|
| — | GK | SUI | Emil Blattmann |
| — | GK | SUI | Paul Blumer |
| — | GK | SUI | Kurt Imhof |
| — | GK | SUI | Gerhard Walter |
| — | DF | SUI | Armando Ardizzoia |
| — | DF | GER | Hermann Enderlin (II) |
| — | DF | SUI | Ernst Grauer |
| — | DF | | Paul Heinrich |
| — | MF | SUI | Ernst Hufschmid |
| — | MF | GER | Emil Hummel |

| No. | Pos. | Nation | Player |
|---|---|---|---|
| — | MF | CZE | Vlastimil Borecký |
| — | MF | SUI | Paul Schaub |
| — | FW | SUI | Karl Bielser |
| — | FW | GER | Alfred Enderlin (I) |
| — | FW | SUI | Adolf Frey |
| — | FW | AUT | Otto Haftl |
| — | FW | SUI | Alfred Jaeck |
| — | MF | SUI | Walter Müller |
| — | MF | SUI | Alfred Schlecht |
| — | FW | AUT | Ferdinand Wesely |
| — | FW | AUT | Josef Chloupek |

== Results ==
=== Legend ===
Win Draw Loss Postponed

=== Friendly matches ===
==== Pre-season ====
| 7 August 1932 Pre-season | Basel | 5–2 | FC Birsfelden | Landhof, Basel |
| | Goal | Summary | Goal | Attendance: 100 |

| 14 August 1932 Pre-season | Luzern | 0–5 | Basel | Tribschen |
| | | Summary | Haftl; Haftl; Haftl; Wesely; Schlecht | Referee: (Switzerland) Martin |

| 18 August 1932 Pre-season | Basel | 2–1 | Nordstern Basel | Landhof, Basel |
| 18:30 | Goal | Summary | Goal | Attendance: 1,500; Referee: (Switzerland) Spiedel |

| 21 August 1932 Pre-season | Baden | 2–8 | Basel | Baden |
| | Goal | Summary | Goal | Attendance: 500 |

==== Winter break to end of season ====
| 1 January 1933 Winter break | Basel | 3–2 | SC Nicholson Wien | Landhof, Basel |
| 14:30 | Müller 12' (1:0); Haftl 60' (2:1); Haftl 61' (3:1) | Summary | 43' (1:1) Kadletz; 85' (3:2) Bydzowsky | Attendance: 2,000; Referee: (Switzerland) Feix Herren |

| 21 January 1933 Mid-season | Basel | 0–3 | SK Admira Wien | Landhof, Basel |
| 14:45 | | Summary | 27' (0:1) Schall; 87' (0:2) Vogl; 88' (0:3) Vogl | Attendance: 5,000; Referee: (Switzerland) Felix Herren Basel |

| 2 April 1933 Mid-season | Basel | 5–5 | Nordstern Basel | Landhof, Basel |
| 16:30 | Frey (2x); Haftl (1x); Hummel (1x); Wesely (1x) | Summary | (2x) Possak (1x) Bucco (1x) Büche | Attendance: 3,000; Referee: (Switzerland) Pollitz Basel |

=== Challenge National ===
==== Group 1 matches ====
| 20 November 1932 Round 1 | Basel | 5–0 | Concordia Basel | Landhof, Basel |
| | Müller 13' (1:0); Jäck 38' (2:0); Jäck 45' (3:0); Jäck 50' (4:0); Wesely 70' (5:0) | Summary | | Attendance: 3,000; Referee: (Switzerland) H. Neumann |

| 27 November 1932 Round 2 | Young Boys | 3–3 | Basel | Wankdorf Stadium, Bern |
| | Schicker 20' (1:0); Ziltener 55' (pen. 2:2); O'Neill 70' (3:2) | Summary | 35' (pen. 1:1) Jäck; 44' (1:2) Hummel oder Müller; 82' (pen. 3:3) Jäck | Attendance: 3,500; Referee: (Switzerland) Diehelm |

| 11 December 1932 Round 3 | Aarau | 1–2 | Basel | Stadion Brügglifeld, Aarau |
| | Schmitt 40' (1:1) | Summary | 38' (o.g. 0:1) Wernli; 80' (1:2) Hummel | Attendance: 1,000; Referee: (Switzerland) Cottier |

| 18 December 1932 Round 4 | Lausanne-Sport | P–P | Basel | Olympique de la Pontaise, Lausanne |
Note: Abandoned after 60 minutes with the score at 2–2 due to fog; Replayed in January

| 2 January 1933 Round 4 | Lausanne-Sport | 4–2 | Basel | Olympique de la Pontaise, Lausanne |
| 14:30 | Lehmann 44' (1:0); Weiller (2:0); Spagnoli (3:0); Spagnoli (4:0) | [ Summary] | (4:1) Haftl (4:2) Haftl | Attendance: 3,500; Referee: (Switzerland) Wittwer |

| 8 January 1933 Round 5 | Servette | 3–0 | Basel | Charmilles Stadium, Geneva |
| 14:30 | Marat 26' (1:0); Kielholz 27' (2:0); Kielholz 65' (3:0) | Summary | | Attendance: 2,000; Referee: (Switzerland) Dagon |

| 15 January 1933 Round 6 | Basel | 2–2 | Nordstern Basel | Landhof, Basel |
| 14:30 | Haftl 6' (1:0); Jäck 80' (pen. 2:2) | Summary | 35' (1:1) Büche; 53' (1:2) Possak | Attendance: 4,000; Referee: (Switzerland) Sally Rosenbaum |

| 22 January 1933 Round 7 | Basel | P–P | Blue Stars Zürich | Landhof, Basel |
Note: Match not played

| 12 February 1933 Round 8 | Basel | 6–1 | Zürich | Landhof, Basel |
| 15:00 | Hufschmid 12' (1:0); Haftl 28' (2:0); Hufschmid 37' (3:0); Jäck 58' (4:0); Jäck (5:0); Wesely 76' (6:0) | Summary | 83' (6:1) Weyermann | Attendance: 3,000; Referee: (Switzerland) Mercet |

==== League table ====
| Pos | Team | Pld | W | D | L | GF | GA | GD | Pts | |
|---|---|---|---|---|---|---|---|---|---|---|
| 1 | Grasshopper Club Zürich | 8 | 7 | 0 | 1 | 41 | 6 | +35 | 14 | Advance to final |
| 2 | Urania Genève Sport | 8 | 6 | 1 | 1 | 37 | 11 | +26 | 13 | |
| 3 | FC Lugano | 8 | 6 | 1 | 1 | 21 | 12 | +9 | 13 | |
| 4 | FC Biel-Bienne | 8 | 5 | 1 | 2 | 16 | 8 | +8 | 11 | |
| 5 | FC Basel | 7 | 3 | 2 | 2 | 20 | 14 | +6 | 8 | |
| 6 | Young Fellows Zürich | 8 | 4 | 0 | 4 | 18 | 15 | +3 | 8 | |
| 7 | FC La Chaux-de-Fonds | 7 | 2 | 3 | 2 | 24 | 18 | +6 | 7 | |
| 8 | Étoile Carouge FC | 8 | 0 | 5 | 3 | 11 | 14 | −3 | 5 | |

Source: https://www.rsssf.org/tablesz/zwit33.html

=== Nationalliga ===
==== Group 1 matches ====
| 28 August 1932 Round 1 | Basel | 6–3 | Etoile Carouge | Landhof, Basel |
| 16:00 | Haftl (1:0); Hufschmid (pen. 2:0); Wesely (3:2); Wesely (4:2); Wesely (5:2); Schlecht (6:2) | Summary | (2:1) Vaccani; 44' (2:2) Machow (6:3) Vaccani | Attendance: 4,000; Referee: (Switzerland) Demartines |

| 4 September 1932 Round 2 | La Chaux-de-Fonds | 2–3 | Basel | Stade Charrière, La Chaux-de-Fonds |
| 15:30 | Ducommun 60' (1:2); Jäggi (pen. 2:3) | Summary | 11' (0:1) Wesely (pen. 0:2) Hufschmid; 70' (1:3) Haftl | Attendance: 3,000; Referee: (Switzerland) Paschoud |

| 11 September 1932 Round 3 | Basel | 1–1 | Lugano | Landhof, Basel |
| 14:00 | Hufschmid 53' (pen.); Müller (red card) | Summary | 31' (0:1) Kittel; (red card) Meier | Attendance: 7,000; Referee: (Switzerland) Meyer |

| 25 September 1932 Round 4 | Grasshopper Club | 7–1 | Basel | Hardturm, Zürich |
| 15:15 | Sekulic 5' (1:0); Sekulic 11' (2:0); Trello 35' (3:1); Trello 47' (4:1); Sekulic 49' (5:1); Xam 61' (6:1); Xam 73' (7:1) | [ Summary] | 33' (2:1) Borecký | Attendance: 9,000; Referee: (Switzerland) Wittwer |

| 9 October 1932 Round 5 | Young Fellows Zürich | 2–2 | Basel | Förrlibuck, Zürich |
| 15:15 | Gyurkovits 15' (1:0); Nehadoma 16' (2:0) | Summary | 69' (2:1) Haftl; 79' (2:2) Haftl | Attendance: 2,500; Referee: (Switzerland) Spengler |

| 16 October 1932 Round 6 | Basel | 4–2 | FC UGS Genève | Landhof, Basel |
| 15:00 | Hummel (1:2); Haftl (2:2); Haftl (3:2); Jäck (4:2) | Summary | (0:1) Courtois (0:2) Jäggi | Attendance: 6,000; Referee: (Switzerland) Hans Wüthrich Bern |

| 30 October 1932 Round 7 | Basel | 6–2 | Biel-Bienne | Landhof, Basel |
| 13:15 | Jäck 22' (1:1); Hummel 25' (2:1); Enderlin (II) 64' (3:2); Wesely 77' (4:2); Haftl 84' (5:2); Hufschmid 87' (pen. 6:2) | Summary | 8' (0:1) Beiner; 40' (2:2) Aebi | Attendance: 4,000; Referee: (Switzerland) Heer |

| 19 February 1933 Round 8 | Basel | 4–1 | La Chaux-de-Fonds | Landhof, Basel |
| 13:15 | Chodat 50' (o.g. 1:1); Wesely 55' (2:1); Wesely 84' (3:1); Müller 88' (4:1) | Summary | 19' (0:1) Matzinger | Referee: (Switzerland) Hans Wüthrich Bern |

| 26 February 1933 Round 9 | Lugano | 1–0 | Basel | Campo Marzio, Lugano |
| | Donizetti 80' (1:0) | Summary | | Attendance: 3,000; Referee: (Switzerland) Spengler |

| 19 March 1933 Round 10 | Basel | 7–0 | Young Fellows Zürich | Landhof, Basel |
| 13:15 | Jäck (1:0); Wesely 22' (2:0); Haftl 26' (3:0); Jäck (4:0); Hufschmid (5:0); Hufschmid (6:0); Hufschmid (7:0) | Summary | | Attendance: 3,000; Referee: (Switzerland) Spengler |

| 26 March 1933 Round 11 | FC UGS Genève | 1–4 | Basel | Stade de Frontenex, Geneva |
| 15:30 | Jäggi 5' (1:0) | Summary | 15' (1:1) Haftl; 49' (1:2) Haftl (1:3) Wesely (1:4) Hufschmid | Attendance: 4,000; Referee: (Switzerland) W. Bangerter Geneva |

| Round 12 | Biel-Bienne | P–P | Basel | Gurzelen Stadion, Biel/Bienne |

| 23 April 1933 Round 13 | Etoile Carouge | 1–1 | Basel | Stade de Frontenex, Geneva |
| 15:00 | Macho 51' (1:1) | Summary | (0.1) Haftl | Attendance: 3,000; Referee: (Switzerland) Endreli |

| 30 April 1933 Round 14 | Basel | 3–3 | Grasshopper Club | Landhof, Basel |
| | Hufschmid 18' (1:0); Hufschmid 55' (2:2); Haftl 62' (3:2) | Summary | (1:1) Xam; 42' (1:2) Xam; 83' (3:3) Xam | Attendance: 15,000; Referee: (Switzerland) Dagon |

| 7 May 1933 Round 12 | Biel-Bienne | 6–3 | Basel | Gurzelen Stadion, Biel/Bienne |
| | Grünfeld II; Binder; Binder (o.g.); Heimer ? | Summary | Frey; Haftl; Haftl | Attendance: 2,000; Referee: (Switzerland) Rapin |

==== League table ====
| Pos | Team | Pld | W | D | L | GF | GA | GD | Pts | Qualification |
|---|---|---|---|---|---|---|---|---|---|---|
| 1 | Grasshopper Club Zürich | 14 | 10 | 3 | 1 | 56 | 26 | +30 | 23 | Qualified for final |
| 2 | FC Basel | 14 | 7 | 4 | 3 | 42 | 29 | +13 | 18 | Qualified for play off |
| 3 | FC Lugano | 14 | 6 | 4 | 4 | 18 | 16 | +2 | 16 | |
| 4 | FC La Chaux-de-Fonds | 14 | 7 | 1 | 6 | 19 | 15 | +4 | 15 | |
| 5 | Urania Genève Sport | 14 | 5 | 2 | 7 | 32 | 32 | 0 | 12 | |
| 6 | Young Fellows Zürich | 14 | 5 | 2 | 7 | 29 | 29 | 0 | 12 | |
| 7 | FC Biel | 14 | 6 | 0 | 8 | 29 | 45 | −16 | 12 | |
| 8 | Étoile Carouge FC | 14 | 1 | 2 | 11 | 15 | 48 | −33 | 4 | Relegated |

Source: rsssf.com

==== Play-off ====
| 28 May 1933 Match between 2nd of both groups | Basel | 3–4 | Servette FC Genève | Stadion Rankhof, Basel |
| 15:00 | Haftl 46' (1:3); Haftl 56' (2:3); Haftl 89' (3:4) | Report | 21' (0:1) Kielholz; 28' (0:2) L'Hote; 38' (0:3) Tax; 75' (2:4) Amado | Attendance: 7,000; Referee: (Switzerland) Enderli |

=== Swiss Cup ===
| 2 October 1932 Round 1 | Basel | 4–2 | Concordia Basel | Landhof, Basel |
| | Wesely 15' (1:1); Wesely (2:1); Haftl (3:1); Hummel (4:1) | FCB summary | (0:1) Rufer; 90' (4:2) Rufer | Attendance: 4,000; Referee: (Switzerland) Hans Wüthrich, (Bern) |
Note: Both teams played the 1932/33 season in the Nationalliga (top-tier), Basel in Group 1 and Concordia in Group 2.

| 13 November 1932 Round 2 | Basel | 3–0 | Blue Stars Zürich | Landhof, Basel |
| 14:30 | Müller 34' (1:0); Haftl 59' (2:0); Hummel (3:0) | FCB summary | | Attendance: 2,500; Referee: (Switzerland) J. Besomo (Neuchâtel) |
Note: Blue Stars played the 1932/33 season in the Nationalliga (top-tier) in Group 2.

| 8 December 1932 Round 3 | AC Bellinzona | 2–3 (a.e.t.) | Basel | Campo Granata, Bellinzona |
| | Berini 51' (1:2); Treier 55' (2:2) | FCB summary | 25' (0:1) Haftl; 49' (0:2) Haftl (2:3) Wesely | Attendance: 1,100; Referee: (Switzerland) Willy Dagon (Solothurn) |
Note: Bellinzona played the 1932/33 season in the 1. Liga (second tier) Group East.

| 5 February 1933 Quarter-final | Basel | 4–2 | Lugano | Landhof, Basel |
| 14:30 | Hufschmid 35' (1:0); Hufschmid 48' (2:0); Wesely 70' (3:1); Müller 73' (4:1) | FCB Summary | (red card) 40' Gilardoni; 69' (2:1) Wilhelm; 86' (4:2) Gianinazzi | Attendance: 6,500; Referee: (Switzerland) Rodolphe Wittwer (Genève) |
Note: Lugano played the 1932/33 season in the Nationalliga (top-tier) Group 1.

| 5 March 1933 Semi-final | Basel | 5–3 | Lausanne-Sport | Stadion Rankhof, Basel |
| 15:00 | Hufschmid 18' (1:1); Haftl 19' (2:1); Jäck 42' (3:1); Wesely 63' (4:2); Jäck 70' (pen. 5:2) | FCB summary | 5' (0:1) A. Lehmann; 45' (3:2) A. Lehmann; 73' (5:3) A. Lehmann | Attendance: 4,000; Referee: (Switzerland) Hans Enderli (Winterthur) |
Note: Lausanne-Sport played the 1932/33 season in the Nationalliga (top-tier) Group 2

| 9 April 1933 Final | Basel | 4–3 | Grasshopper Club | Hardturm, Zürich |
| 15:00 | Haftl 29' (1:1); Jäck 44' (2:1); Haftl 60' (3:1); Müller 68' (4:1) | Fussball-Schweiz summary FCB summary | 23' (0:1) Hitrec; 71' (4:2) Schneider; 84' (pen. 4:3) A. Abegglen | Attendance: 15,000; Referee: (Switzerland) Rodolphe Wittwer (Genève) |
Note: GC played the 1932/33 season in the Nationalliga (top-tier) Group 1.

== See also ==
- History of FC Basel
- List of FC Basel players
- List of FC Basel seasons

== Sources ==
- Rotblau: Jahrbuch Saison 2014/2015. Publisher: FC Basel Marketing AG. ISBN 978-3-7245-2027-6
- Die ersten 125 Jahre. Publisher: Josef Zindel im Friedrich Reinhardt Verlag, Basel. ISBN 978-3-7245-2305-5
- FCB team 1932–33 at fcb-archiv.ch
- Übersicht bei RSSSF
