= Otto Haftl =

Austrian footballer

Personal information
- Full name: Otto Haftl
- Date of birth: 29 November 1902
- Place of birth: Austria
- Date of death: 16 September 1995 (aged 92)
- Position: Striker

Senior career*
Years	Team	Apps	(Gls)
1923–1925	SC Wacker Wien		
1925–1926	Wiener AC		
1926–1927	SC Wacker Wien		
1929–1930	Teplitzer FK		
1929–1931	AC Sparta Prague		
1931–1935	FC Basel	88	(75)
1935–1937	Young Fellows Zürich	29	(8)

International career
1925–1929	Austria	3	(2)

Managerial career
- 1931–1932: FC Basel
- 1938–1941: SC Wacker Wien
- * Club domestic league appearances and goals

Otto Haftl (29 November 1902 – 16 September 1995) was an Austrian footballer who played his club career in Austria, Czechoslovakia and Switzerland. He also played for the Austria national team. He played mainly in the position of striker.

== Club career ==
Haftl started his football career in Austria for SC Wacker Wien and also played one season for Wiener AC. In 1929 he moved to Czechoslovakia and played first for Teplitzer FK and then for AC Sparta Prague.

He then moved to Switzerland, becoming Basel's first ever professional football player. Between the years 1931 and 1935 Haftl played a total of 144 games for Basel, scoring a total of 130 goals. 88 of these games were in the Swiss Serie A, 20 in the Swiss Cup and 36 were friendly games. He scored 75 goal in the domestic league, 21 in the Swiss Cup and the other 28 were scored during the test games. During his first season at the club he acted as player-manager after Gustav Putzendopler laid down the job as trainer.

An episode that is noted in association with the Swiss Cup, was the second-round replay away against FC Lugano on 22 November 1931. The mood amongst the 3,000 spectators was heated even before the kick-off. This because after the 3–3 draw in the first game; the local press had circulated the most incredible rumours. Then, Basel's Alfred Schlecht scored the winning goal early, not even two minutes after the game had started. However, shortly before the end of the match referee Hans Wüthrich did not blow his whistle and award a penalty after an alleged handball by a Basel player. The referee ended the game shortly afterwards with a Basel victory and the ill tempers were worsened. After the game there were tumults and riots among the spectators who were not satisfied with the referee's performance. Stones were thrown at referee and players and the windows of the changing rooms were smashed. It was some eight hours later before things were settled enough for the police to able to bring both the referee and the entire Basel team to safety, by ship over Lake Lugano. According to the reports in the club chronicles, quite a few players were injured. Josef Remay had a bleeding head, Hermann Enderlin had a hole above his eye, Leopold Kielholz and goalkeeper Paul Blumer were also hurt. Haftl escaped unhurt. Lugano was sanctioned and had to play their home games at least 100 kilometers from their home ground.

The following season (1932–33), with the fellow Austrian Karl Kurz as trainer, Basel won the Swiss Cup. The final was played in the Hardturm stadium against Grasshopper Club on Sunday 9 April 1933. Basel won 4–3 and it was the club's first ever national title. Haftl scored two goals in the final and there were two other fellow Austrians in the team, Ferdinand Wesely and Josef Chloupek.

Haftl ended his football career playing two seasons for Young Fellows Zürich from 1935 to 1937. In the season 1938–39 he joined SC Wacker Wien as trainer and remained there until December 1941,

== International ==
Haftl played three times for his country. His first international appearance for Austria came in May 1925 against Hungary. In this home fixture in Wien, he scored his two international goals, the first in the 38th minute and the second in the 88th. Austria won 3–1. His second international game was an away game against the same opponents. His last game for Austria was against Italy on 7 April 1929.

== Honours ==
Basel

- Swiss Cup winner: 1933

== Sources ==
- Rotblau: Jahrbuch Saison 2017/2018. Publisher: FC Basel Marketing AG. ISBN 978-3-7245-2189-1
- Die ersten 125 Jahre. Publisher: Josef Zindel im Friedrich Reinhardt Verlag, Basel. ISBN 978-3-7245-2305-5
- Verein "Basler Fussballarchiv" Homepage
