= Ernst Hufschmid (footballer) =

Swiss footballer (1913-2001)

Personal information
- Full name: Ernst Hufschmid
- Date of birth: 4 February 1913
- Place of birth: Basel, Switzerland
- Date of death: 30 November 2001 (aged 88)
- Place of death: Basel, Switzerland
- Height: 1.75 m (5 ft 9 in)
- Positions: Defender; midfielder

Senior career*
Years	Team	Apps	(Gls)
1929–1950	Basel	268	(51)
1938–1939	Biel-Bienne	11	(1)

International career
1932–1934	Switzerland	11	(1)

Managerial career
- 1947–1952: Basel
- 1956–1957: Nordstern Basel
- 1957–1958: FC Breitenbach
- * Club domestic league appearances and goals

Ernst Hufschmid (born 4 February 1913 in Basel – 30 November 2001 in Basel) was a Swiss footballer who played for Basel and Biel-Bienne. He also played for Switzerland in the 1934 FIFA World Cup. He played mainly in the position as midfielder, but in his later career also as defender.

== Club football ==
Hufschmid played a total of 402 matches for Basel between 1929 and 1950. He scored 83 goals during this time. 268 of these games were in the Nationalliga, 53 in the Swiss Cup and 91 were friendly games. He scored 51 goals in the domestic league, 11 in the Swiss Cup and the other 22 were scored during the test games. He played for six months for Biel-Bienne in 11 games scoring one goal.

An episode that is noted in association with the Swiss Cup, was the second-round replay away against FC Lugano on 22 November 1931. The mood amongst the 3,000 spectators was heated even before the kick-off. This because after the 3–3 draw in the first game; the local press had circulated the most incredible rumours. Then, Basel's Alfred Schlecht scored the winning goal early, not even two minutes after the game had started. However, shortly before the end of the match referee Hans Wüthrich did not blow his whistle and award a penalty after an alleged handball by a Basel player. The referee ended the game shortly afterwards with a Basel victory and the ill tempers were worsened. After the game there were tumults and riots among the spectators who were not satisfied with the referee's performance. Stones were thrown at referee and players and the windows of the changing rooms were smashed. It was some eight hours before things were settled enough for the police to able to bring both the referee and the entire Basel team to safety, by ship over Lake Lugano. According to the reports in the club chronicles, quite a few players were injured. Josef Remay had a bleeding head, Hermann Enderlin had a hole above his eye, Leopold Kielholz and goalkeeper Paul Blumer were also hurt. Hufschmid escaped unhurt. Lugano was sanctioned and had to play their next home games at least 100 kilometers from their home ground.

In their season 1932–33 Basel advanced to the Swiss Cup Final due to a 5–3 win in the semi-final, in which Hufschmid scored the first goal, against Lausanne Sports. Hufschmid played in the final, which was played in the Hardturm in Zürich against Grasshopper Club. Basel won the final 4–3 and this the club's first ever title win.

After suffering relegation to the 1st League (second flight of Swiss football) in 1938–39, during the 1941–42 season Basel achieved promotion to the Nationalliga as they beat Bern in the play-offs. Hufschmid and Basel qualified for the Swiss Cup final for a second time. This was played on 6 April 1942 in the Wankdorf Stadion against the Nationalliga team Grasshopper Club. The final ended goalless after extra time and a replay was required. The replay was on 25 May, again in the Wankdorf Stadion. Basel led by half time through two goals by Fritz Schmidlin, but two goals from Grubenmann a third from Neukom gave the Grasshoppers a 3–2 victory.

After his playing career the Austrian ex-international Anton Schall, who suffered from a rare heart condition, moved to Switzerland and took over Basel as club trainer for the 1946–47 season. Basel advanced to the Cup-Final, which was played in the Stadion Neufeld in Bern on 7 April 1947. Basel won the final 3–0 against Lausanne Sport and thus their second cup title. Schall led Basel to win the Cup, but he died shortly afterwards at the age of 40 years during a workout on the football field. Following this unhappy event captain Hufschmid took over as player/coach and after his playing career he remained as team coach until 1952. He later managed Nordstern Basel and FC Breitenbach.

== National team ==
Hufschmid gained 11 caps for the Swiss national football team. His debut was on 19. June 1932 as Switzerland beat Hungary 3–1.

He scored his sole goal for the Swiss team on 29 October 1933 in the 2–2 draw with Romania during the 1934 FIFA World Cup qualification game. Hufschmid played both games in the 1934 World Cup.

His final game for the Swiss national team on 4 November 1934 as they won a test match 4–2 against the Netherlands.

== Honours ==
Basel

- Swiss Cup winner: 1932–33 as player, 1946–47 as manager
- Swiss Cup runner-up: 1941–42 as player

== Curiosity ==
Hufschmid played his last domestic league match on 23 April 1950 in Espenmoos, St. Gallen, as Basel were defeated by St. Gallen. In the Basel's 1950–51 season he played one more match, it was his last active match as football player and this he played as goalkeeper. On 10 August 1950 Football Club Basel played against Eishockey Club Basel. This was a return game for the ice hockey game EHC-FCB in December 1949. The football team won the football match 14–5. Goalkeeper Walter Müller played as striker and he scored six goals.

== Sources ==
- Rotblau: Jahrbuch Saison 2017/2018. Publisher: FC Basel Marketing AG. ISBN 978-3-7245-2189-1
- Die ersten 125 Jahre. Publisher: Josef Zindel im Friedrich Reinhardt Verlag, Basel. ISBN 978-3-7245-2305-5
- Verein "Basler Fussballarchiv" Homepage
