= Vlastimil Borecký =

Czechoslovak footballer

Personal information
- Full name: Vlastimil Borecký
- Date of birth: 1 June 1907
- Place of birth: Prague, Austria-Hungary
- Date of death: unknown
- Position: Midfielder

Youth career
- –1924: Čechie Karlín

Senior career*
Years	Team	Apps	(Gls)
1924–1930	Čechie Karlín		
1930	Stade Rennais		
1931	Antibes		
1931	Wiener AC		
1931–1934	FC Basel	40	(2)
1934–1935	Saint-Malo		
1935–1938	Stade Malherbe Caen		
1938–1939	Cantonal Neuchatel		

Managerial career
- 1941–1942: SK Židenice
- * Club domestic league appearances and goals

Vlastimil Borecký (* 1 June 1907; † unknown) was a Czechoslovak footballer who played mainly in the position of midfielder. Later he became a club manager.

== Career ==
Borecký started his youth football with local club Čechie Karlín. He later played for their first team for six seasons. Before the season 1930–31 he moved to France and played first for Stade Rennais and then for FC Antibes. He then moved to Wiener AC.

In the three seasons between the years 1931 and 1934 Borecký played a total of 72 games for Basel scoring 4 goals. 40 of these games were in the Nationalliga, 12 were in the Swiss Cup and 19 were friendly games. He scored two goals in the domestic league. The first being in the game on 25 September 1932 against Grasshopper Club. The second goal was scored in the match against Zürich on 29 October 1933. The other two goals were scored during the test games.

An episode that is noted in association with the Swiss Cup, was the second-round replay away against FC Lugano on 22 November 1931. The mood amongst the 3,000 spectators was heated even before the kick-off. This because after the 3–3 draw in the first game; the local press had circulated the most incredible rumours. Then, Basel's Alfred Schlecht scored the winning goal early, not even two minutes after the game had started. However, shortly before the end of the match referee Hans Wüthrich did not blow his whistle and award a penalty after an alleged handball by a Basel player. The referee ended the game shortly afterwards with a Basel victory and the ill tempers were worsened. After the game there were tumults and riots among the spectators who were not satisfied with the referee's performance. Stones were thrown at referee and players and the windows of the changing rooms were smashed. It was some eight hours before things were settled enough for the police to able to bring both the referee and the entire Basel team to safety, by ship over Lake Lugano. According to the reports in the club chronicles, quite a few players were injured. Josef Remay had a bleeding head, Hermann Enderlin had a hole above his eye, Leopold Kielholz and goalkeeper Paul Blumer were also hurt. Borecký escaped unhurt. Lugano was sanctioned and had to play their home games at least 100 kilometers from their home ground.

Borecký was a member of the Basel team that won the Swiss Cup in the 1932–33 season. The final was played in the Hardturm stadium against Grasshopper Club. Basel won 4–3 and achieved the club's first ever national title.

During the summer of 1934, Borecký moved back to France and played one season for Saint-Malo and three seasons for Stade Malherbe Caen. For the season 1938–1939 he returned to Switzerland and ended his playing career at Cantonal Neuchatel.

During the season 1941–1942 Borecký was club manager of SK Židenice.

== Honours ==
- Swiss Cup winner: 1932–33

== Sources ==
- Rotblau: Jahrbuch Saison 2017/2018. Publisher: FC Basel Marketing AG. ISBN 978-3-7245-2189-1
- Die ersten 125 Jahre. Publisher: Josef Zindel im Friedrich Reinhardt Verlag, Basel. ISBN 978-3-7245-2305-5
- Verein "Basler Fussballarchiv" Homepage
