= Haist =

Haist is a surname of German origin. Notable people with this surname include:

- Jane Haist (1948–2022), Canadian discus thrower and shotputter
- Josef Haist (1894–1950), Austrian footballer
- Karl Haist (born 1938), German sailor
- Marie Haist (1925–2021), American woman who was a friend of Zach Galifianakis and featured in the documentary Queen Mimi
