= Giovanni Lupi =

Swiss football player (1908-1990)

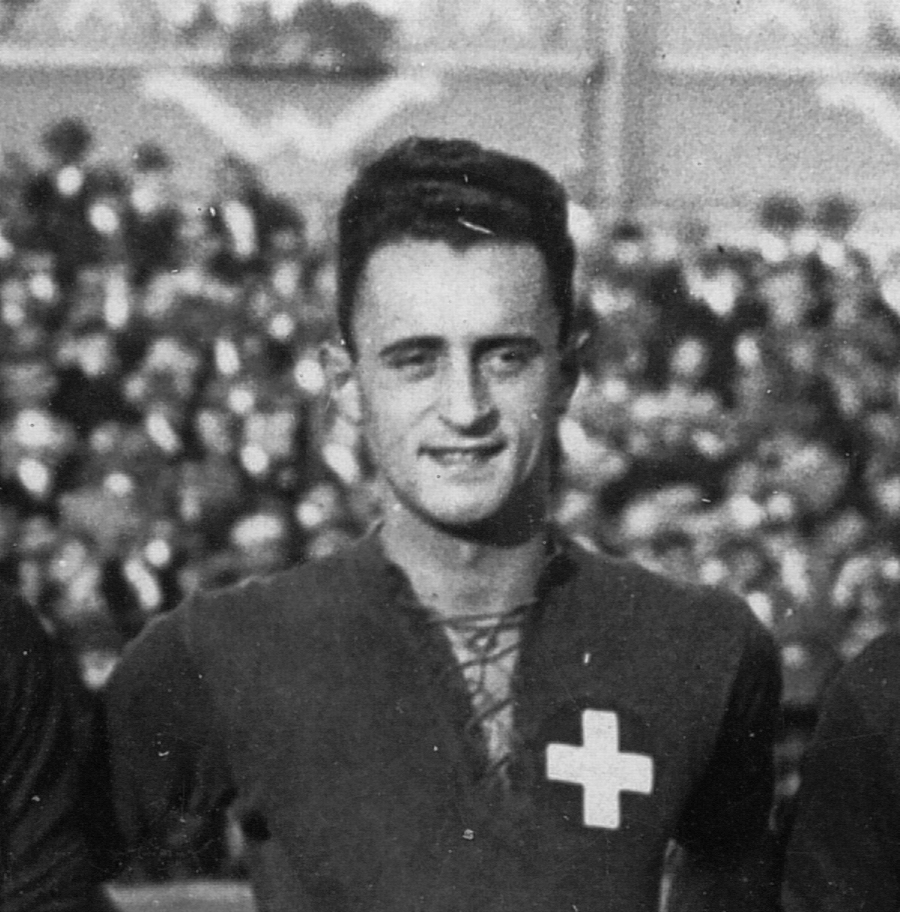

Personal information
- Full name: Giovanni Lupi
- Date of birth: 24 December 1908
- Place of birth: Chiasso, Switzerland
- Date of death: 20 November 1990 (aged 81)
- Place of death: Arosio, Switzerland
- Position: Midfielder

Senior career*
| Years | Team | Apps | (Gls) |
| 1925–1931 | FC Chiasso | | |
| 1931–1932 | FC Basel | 3 | (0) |

International career
| 1929 | Switzerland | 1 | (0) |
- * Club domestic league appearances and goals

Giovanni Lupi, commonly known as Nino, (24 December 1908 – 20 November 1990) was a Swiss footballer who played in the 1920s and 1930s. He played as midfielder.

== Football career ==
From 1925, Lupi played for FC Chiasso, who at that time played in the Serie B, the second tier of Swiss football. Following the 1926–27 season Chiasso won promotion to the Serie A.

In 1929, Lupi was called up for the Swiss national team. He played his debut for them on 6 October in the away game against Czechoslovakia. The Swiss were beaten 0–5, and this remained his only appearance for his country.

Lupi joined FC Basel's first team for their 1931–32 season under coach Gustav Putzendopler. After playing in one test game, Lupi played his domestic league debut for the club in the home game in the Landhof on 30 August 1931 as Basel were defeated 1–4 by Young Fellows Zürich.

He played with the team for only half a year, and during this time, Lupi played a total of five games for Basel without scoring a goal. Three of these games were in the Serie A and two were friendly games.

== Sources ==
- Rotblau: Jahrbuch Saison 2017/2018. Publisher: FC Basel Marketing AG. ISBN 978-3-7245-2189-1
- Die ersten 125 Jahre. Publisher: Josef Zindel im Friedrich Reinhardt Verlag, Basel. ISBN 978-3-7245-2305-5
- Verein "Basler Fussballarchiv" Homepage
