= Hans Greiner =

Swiss footballer (born 1912)

Personal information
- Full name: Hans Greiner
- Date of birth: 1912
- Place of birth: Switzerland
- Position: Midfielder

Senior career*
Years	Team	Apps	(Gls)
1933–1936	FC Basel	59	(2)

International career
1934	Switzerland	1	(0)
- * Club domestic league appearances and goals

Hans Greiner (born 1912; date of death unknown) was a Swiss footballer who played for FC Basel and the Swiss national team. He played as midfielder.

Greiner joined Basel's first team in advance of their 1933–34 season. After playing in three test games, he played his domestic league debut for the club in the away game on 27 August 1933 as Basel played a 3–3 draw against Locarno. He scored his first goal for his club on 15 April 1934, in the away game against local rivals Concordia Basel. In fact Greiner scored two goals as Basel won 3–0.

Between the years 1933 and 1936 Greiner played a total of 85 games for Basel scoring a total of six goals. 59 of these games were in the Swiss Serie A, 10 in the Swiss Cup and 16 were friendly games. He scored the afore mentioned two goals in the domestic league and the other four were scored during the test games.

Greiner also played one match for Switzerland. This was on 14 October 1934 in the Charmilles Stadium, Geneva, against Czechoslovakia as the two teams drew 2–2.

== Sources ==
- Rotblau: Jahrbuch Saison 2017/2018. Publisher: FC Basel Marketing AG. ISBN 978-3-7245-2189-1
- Die ersten 125 Jahre. Publisher: Josef Zindel im Friedrich Reinhardt Verlag, Basel. ISBN 978-3-7245-2305-5
- Verein "Basler Fussballarchiv" Homepage
