= Eduard Zuber =

Swiss footballer (1914-1990)

Personal information
- Full name: Eduard Zuber
- Date of birth: 22 July 1914
- Place of birth: Switzerland
- Date of death: 1990 (aged 75–76)
- Position: Midfielder

Senior career*
Years	Team	Apps	(Gls)
1933–1939	FC Basel	56	(2)
- * Club domestic league appearances and goals

Eduard Zuber (22 July 1914 – 1990 ) was a Swiss footballer who played for FC Basel. He played as midfielder.

Zuber joined Basel's first team in their 1933–34 season. His first game was the friendly game against Ferencvárosi TC, a match organised to celebrate the club's 40th anniversary. He played his domestic league debut for the club in the away game on 24 December 1933 against Grasshopper Club. He scored his first goal for his club on 23 September 1934 in the away game against Lausanne-Sport as Basel were defeated 3–5.

Between the years 1933 and 1939 Zuber played a total of 82 games for Basel scoring a total of five goals. 56 of these games were in the domestic league, four in the Swiss Cup and 22 were friendly games. He scored two goals in the domestic league, the other three were scored during the test games.

== Sources ==
- Rotblau: Jahrbuch Saison 2017/2018. Publisher: FC Basel Marketing AG. ISBN 978-3-7245-2189-1
- Die ersten 125 Jahre. Publisher: Josef Zindel im Friedrich Reinhardt Verlag, Basel. ISBN 978-3-7245-2305-5
- Verein "Basler Fussballarchiv" Homepage
