= Karl Kurz =

Austrian footballer and manager

Karl Kurz (born 21 November 1898; died 26 November 1933 in Basel, Switzerland) was an Austrian football player and manager. He played 32 games for the Austrian national side, first playing about 1919.

== Playing career ==
=== Club ===
Kurz played mostly as a winger but by the end of his career he had been deployed as a central midfielder on occasions. Slight in stature, his preferences lay in the ball control, the game overview and the positional play.

He began playing football as a pupil at Klosterneuburg drill ground and eventually played for the Vienna school boys' team and the youth team at First Vienna FC where he played alongside Victor Hierländer and Karl Jiszda. In 1915, he began playing for Floridsdorfer Amateurs but after just three games he joined the Austrian Army and in May 1916 he was sent into battle during World War I. He returned from the war wounded in 1917 and began playing with FK Austria Wien after his recovery, and helped them finish league runners up in 1920.

In 1921, he moved to Ridge Vienna FC where he finished league runner up twice more. He then signed for 1 more season with 1. Simmeringer SC and retired in March 1927 to work as a coach in Latvia. However, he returned to Vienna in October of that year to play amateur football but had to retire in Winter 1928 due to an illness that would later turn out to be leukaemia.

=== International ===
Kurz's first international appearance for Austria came in November 1919 against Hungary. From 1921 until 1926, he played as Austria's right winger in every fixture. His last game for Austria was against Italy in November 1928. He earned 32 caps for Austria and 15 for the Vienna Select XI.

== Coaching career ==
After a short spell as a coach in Latvia in 1927, Kurz's next coaching roll was as assistant manager to Robert Lang at FK Austria Wien in 1929. In 1930, he became manager of FC Grenchen in Switzerland and then FC Basel in 1931. With Basel in the season 1932–33, he won the Schweizer Cup with three fellow Austrians, Ferdinand Wesely, Josef Chloupek and Otto Haftl, in the team.

== Death ==
He died on 26 November 1933 in Basel when his leukaemia worsened. He was 35 years old.
