= Emil Blattmann =

Swiss footballer

Personal information
- Full name: Emil Blattmann
- Place of birth: Switzerland
- Position: Goalkeeper

Senior career*
Years	Team	Apps	(Gls)
1932–1934	FC Basel	4	(0)
- * Club domestic league appearances and goals

Emil Blattmann was a Swiss footballer who played for FC Basel. He played as goalkeeper.

Blattmann joined Basel's first team in 1932 as reserve goalkeeper. He played his domestic league debut for the club in the away game on 23 April 1932 as Basel drew 1–1 against Etoile Carouge.

In the two Basel seasons 1932–33 and 1933–34 Blattmann played a total of five games for Basel. Four of these games were in the Swiss Serie A and the other one was a friendly game.

== Sources ==
- Rotblau: Jahrbuch Saison 2017/2018. Publisher: FC Basel Marketing AG. ISBN 978-3-7245-2189-1
- Die ersten 125 Jahre. Publisher: Josef Zindel im Friedrich Reinhardt Verlag, Basel. ISBN 978-3-7245-2305-5
- Verein "Basler Fussballarchiv" Homepage
