= Tibor Kemény =

Hungarian footballer (1913–1992)

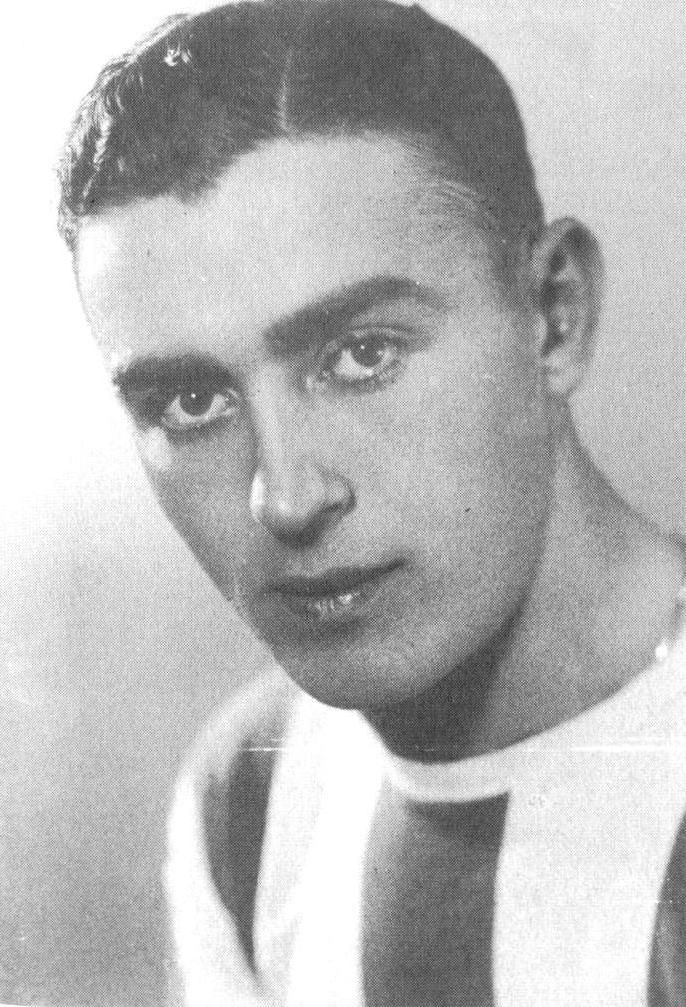

Personal information
- Date of birth: 5 March 1913
- Place of birth: Budapest, Austria-Hungary
- Date of death: 25 September 1992 (aged 79)
- Height: 1.74 m (5 ft 9 in)
- Position: Striker

Senior career*
Years	Team	Apps	(Gls)
- Ferencváros

International career
1933–1937	Hungary	9	(0)

Managerial career
- 1949–1950: Újpest FC
- 1955: MTK Budapest
- 1956: Dorogi FC
- 1957–1958: Olympiacos
- 1966–1967: GKS Katowice
- 1967–1968: Zagłębie Sosnowiec
- * Club domestic league appearances and goals

Tibor Kemeny (5 March 1913 – 25 September 1992) also referred to as Kemeny Tibor, was a Hungarian football player and coach, who played as a striker for Ferencváros and the Hungary national team (nine caps). He was part of the team in the 1934 World Cup. He played one match in World Cup, against Austria in the quarter finals (Hungary lost 2–1). With Ferencváros, he faced Juventus twice in 1938.

As a coach, he managed Ujpest FC in the 1949–50 season, and Olympiacos in 1957–58. With Olympiacos, he celebrated a League title and a Cup, succeeding the double in his only season in the team. He worked the 4-2-4, and with him as coach, Olympiacos played great football, that Marton Bukovi continued when he came to Piraeus.

Kemeny also managed MTK Hungaria in 1955, leading the team to win the Mitropa Cup this season and Zagłębie Sosnowiec.

== Honours ==
=== Player ===
Ferencváros

- Hungarian League: 1932, 1934, 1938, 1940, 1941
- Hungarian Cup: 1933, 1935, 1942, 1943, 1944
- Mitropa Cup: 1937

=== Manager ===
MTK Hungaria

- Mitropa Cup: 1955

Olympiacos

- Panhellenic Champinship: 1957–58
- Greek Cup: 1957–58
