= Gerhard Walter =

Swiss footballer (born 1915)

Personal information
- Full name: Gerhard Walter
- Date of birth: 27 September 1915
- Place of birth: Switzerland
- Position: Goalkeeper

Senior career*
Years	Team	Apps	(Gls)
1931–1933	FC Basel	6	(0)

Managerial career
- 1945–1946: Luzern
- 1948–1950: Grasshoppers
- * Club domestic league appearances and goals

Gerhard Walter (born 27 September 1915; date of death unknown) was a Swiss footballer who played two seasons for FC Basel in the early 1930s. He played as goalkeeper.

Walter joined Basel's first team in 1931. He played his domestic league debut for the club in the home game at the Landhof on 30 August 1931 as Basel lost 1–4 against Young Fellows Zürich.

In the two Basel seasons 1931–32 and 1932–33 Walter played a total of eight games for Basel Six of these games were in the Swiss Serie A and two in the Swiss Cup.

== Sources ==
- Rotblau: Jahrbuch Saison 2017/2018. Publisher: FC Basel Marketing AG. ISBN 978-3-7245-2189-1
- Die ersten 125 Jahre. Publisher: Josef Zindel im Friedrich Reinhardt Verlag, Basel. ISBN 978-3-7245-2305-5
- Verein "Basler Fussballarchiv" Homepage
