= Ferdinand Klemm =

Czechoslovak footballer

Personal information
- Date of birth: unknown
- Place of birth: Teplice, Czechia
- Position: Goalkeeper

Senior career*
Years	Team	Apps	(Gls)
1930–1932	Teplitzer FK	19	(0)
1932	FC Basel	2	(0)
1932–1933	Teplitzer FK		
- * Club domestic league appearances and goals

Ferdinand Klemm was a Czechoslovak footballer who played as goalkeeper in the 1930s.

== Football career ==
Klemm was born in Teplice and first played for local team Teplitzer FK. In the 1930–31 Czechoslovak First League, Klemm played in 12 of the team's 14 matches and the team ended the season in seventh position, which meant that they had to enter the play-off against relegation. Both matches against their opponents SK Rakovník were won and Teplitzer FK retained their First League status. In the first half of the 1931–32 season, he played another 7 matches for Teplitzer.

Klemm joined Basel's first team as a guest player during the second half of the 1931–32 season. During this period it was quite common that players from other countries joined a different team for just part of the season. After playing in one friendly match against Freiburger FC, Klemm played his domestic league debut for the Basel in the home game in the Landhof on 24 January 1932 as Basel were defeated 0–3 by Zürich.

During his guest period with Basel, Klemm also played in the Swiss Cup quarter-final match on 7 February as Basel won 6–3 against La Chaux-de-Fonds. During his few months with the club Klemm played a total of five games as goalkeeper for Basel before returning to Teplitzer FK. Two of these games were in the Swiss Serie A, one in the Swiss Cup and two were friendly games.

== Sources ==
- Rotblau: Jahrbuch Saison 2017/2018. Publisher: FC Basel Marketing AG. ISBN 978-3-7245-2189-1
- Die ersten 125 Jahre. Publisher: Josef Zindel im Friedrich Reinhardt Verlag, Basel. ISBN 978-3-7245-2305-5
- Verein "Basler Fussballarchiv" Homepage

(NB: Despite all efforts, the editors of these books and the authors in "Basler Fussballarchiv" have failed to be able to identify all the players, their date and place of birth or date and place of death, who played in the games during the early years of FC Basel)
