= Ferdinand Spichiger =

Swiss footballer (born 1909)

Personal information
- Full name: Ferdinand Spichiger
- Date of birth: 1909
- Place of birth: Switzerland
- Position: Midfielder

Senior career*
Years	Team	Apps	(Gls)
1934–1937	FC Basel	12	(3)
- * Club domestic league appearances and goals

Ferdinand Spichiger (born 1909) was a Swiss footballer who played for FC Basel in the mid 1930s. He played as midfielder.

Spichiger joined Basel's first team in 1934. After one test game against FC Liestal, Spichiger played his domestic league debut for the club in the home game at the Landhof on 15 September 1934 as Basel won 3–0 against Locarno. He scored his first goal for his club on 30 September 1934 in the home game also at the Landhof against FC Bern. It was the first goal of the game and Basel won 3–1.

Between the years 1934 and 1937 Spichiger played a total of 19 games for Basel scoring a total of three goals. 12 of these games were in the Nationalliga, two games in the Swiss Cup and five were friendly games. He scored all three of his goals in the domestic league.

== Sources ==
- Rotblau: Jahrbuch Saison 2017/2018. Publisher: FC Basel Marketing AG. ISBN 978-3-7245-2189-1
- Die ersten 125 Jahre. Publisher: Josef Zindel im Friedrich Reinhardt Verlag, Basel. ISBN 978-3-7245-2305-5
- Verein "Basler Fussballarchiv" Homepage
