= Josef Haist =

Austrian footballer (1894–1950)

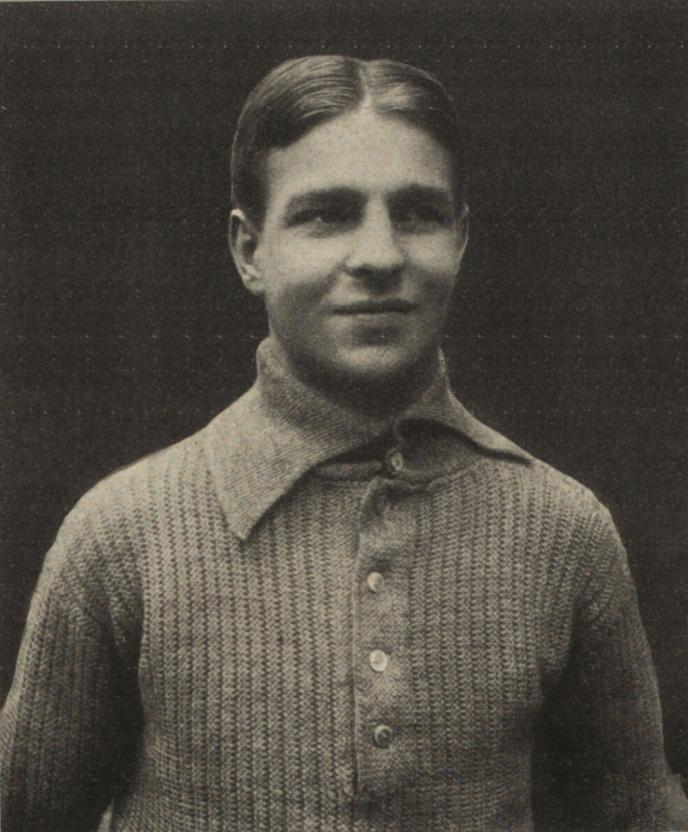
- Haist in 1914

Personal information
- Date of birth: 31 December 1894
- Date of death: 21 January 1950 (aged 55)
- Position: Midfielder

Senior career*
Years	Team	Apps	(Gls)
- Wiener AF

International career
1914–1917	Austria	5	(0)

Managerial career
- 1921–1922: Wiener AF
- 1923–1924: Sturm Graz
- 1927–1928: SC Brühl
- 1934: FC Basel
- 1938: FC Winterthur
- 1948–1951: Grazer AK
- * Club domestic league appearances and goals

Josef Haist (31 December 1894 – 21 January 1950) was an Austrian football player and manager. A midfielder, he played for Wiener AF and made five appearances for the Austria national team from 1914 to 1917.
