= Emil Hummel =

German footballer

Personal information
- Full name: Emil Hummel
- Date of birth: 1911
- Place of birth: Germany
- Position: Defender

Senior career*
Years	Team	Apps	(Gls)
1931–1938	FC Basel	114	(11)
1938–1940	FC Kreuzlingen		
- * Club domestic league appearances and goals

Emil Hummel (born 1911; date of death unknown) was a German footballer who played for FC Basel. He played mainly in the position of defender.

Between the years 1931 and 1938 Hummel played a total of 178 games for Basel scoring a total of 17 goals. 114 of these games were in the Swiss Serie A, 18 in the Swiss Cup. He scored 11 goals in the domestic league and five in the Swiss Cup. The other 46 games and the other goal scored were during the friendly/test games. Hummel was a member of the Basel team that won the Swiss Cup in the 1932–33 season. The final was played in the Hardturm stadium against Grasshopper Club. Basel won 4–3 and achieved the club's first ever national title.

For the season 1938–1939 Hummel transferred to FC Kreuzlingen where he stayed for two years before ending his football career.

== Honours ==
- Swiss Cup winner: 1932–33

== Sources ==
- Rotblau: Jahrbuch Saison 2017/2018. Publisher: FC Basel Marketing AG. ISBN 978-3-7245-2189-1
- Die ersten 125 Jahre. Publisher: Josef Zindel im Friedrich Reinhardt Verlag, Basel. ISBN 978-3-7245-2305-5
- Verein "Basler Fussballarchiv" Homepage
