= Alfred Jäck =

Swiss footballer (1911-1953)

Personal information
- Full name: Alfred Jäck (or Jaeck)
- Date of birth: 2 August 1911
- Place of birth: Allschwil, Switzerland
- Date of death: 28 August 1953 (aged 42)
- Position: Forward

Youth career
- Basel

Senior career*
Years	Team	Apps	(Gls)
1930–1931	Basel		
1931–1933	Servette	28	(4)
1933–1936	Basel		
1936–1937	Olympique Lillois		
1937–1939	Mulhouse		
1939–1940	Basel		

International career
1931–1936	Switzerland	28	(2)
- * Club domestic league appearances and goals

Alfred Jaeck (2 August 1911, in Allschwil – 28 August 1953) was a Swiss footballer who played as a forward.

Jaeck started his playing career with Basel. A well-documented curiosity was that at the end of Basel's 1929–30 season, the team set off on a Scandinavian football tour, including a visit to Germany. Six games were played in Norway, but the first was played in Leipzig. The team travelled with 15 players, their trainer Kertész and two functionaries. The journey started with a train ride on 2 June 1930 at quarter past seven in the morning from Basel and they arrived in Leipzig at half passed eight that evening. The game against VfB Leipzig was played the next evening. The following one and a half days were spent travelling by train, train, ship, train and train again to Drammen in Norway. Only a few hours after their arrival, the team played a game against a joint team Mjøndalen IF / SBK Drafn. The next day was a train journey to Porsgrunn and two matches in 24 hours. Following that they travelled per bus and then by ship in a 48-hour journey to Bergen for a match against SK Brann. Another ship voyage, this time to Stavanger, two games against Viking FK, then a ship voyage back to Bergen. Finally, the tour ended with three train journeys in three days, Bergen/Oslo/Berlin/Basel, arriving at home on 20 June. The result of this tour was seven games, four wins, one draw, two defeats and approximately 160 hours of travelling. Jaeck was participant in this tour. He played in six games and scored four goals.

Jaeck then played two seasons for Servette and returned to his home club Basel in 1932 for four years. He was member of the Basel team that won the Swiss Cup in the 1932–33 season. The final was played in the Hardturm stadium against Grasshopper Club. Basel won 4–3 and thus the club's first ever national title.

Jaeck then moved to France. He spent the season 1936–37 with French first division side Olympique Lillois, followed by a further two seasons with Mulhouse. He returned to his home country in 1939 and finished his career with home club Basel for whom he scored a total of 73 goals in 170 appearances.

Between 1931 and 1936, he represented Switzerland 28 times at international level, scoring twice, and was part of Switzerland's 1934 FIFA World Cup squad.

In August 1953 Jaeck suffered a heavy car accident and he died due to the consequences.

== Honours ==
Basel

- Swiss Cup winner: 1933
