= Josef Chloupek =

Austrian footballer (1908–1974)

Personal information
- Full name: Josef Chloupek
- Date of birth: 22 April 1908
- Place of birth: Vienna, Austria
- Date of death: 11 January 1974 (aged 65)
- Position: Defender

Youth career
- Floridsdorfer AC

Senior career*
Years	Team	Apps	(Gls)
1927–1931	Floridsdorfer AC		
1931–1933	FC Zürich	26	(1)
1933	FC Lugano	4	(0)
1933–1934	FC Basel	18	(0)
1934–1935	Olympique Marseille		
1935–1936	Floridsdorfer AC		
1936–1938	Wiener SC		
1938–1940	SK Dürnkrut		
- * Club domestic league appearances and goals

Josef Chloupek (22 April 1908 – 11 January 1974) was an Austrian footballer who played as a defender in the late 1920s and 1930s.

He played youth football by Floridsdorfer AC, joining their first team in 1927, and remained with them until 1931 before moving to FC Zürich. A year later he moved onto FC Basel, but because he was unable to obtain playing time, he moved to and played for Lugano for a few months.

Chloupek then rejoined FC Basel's first team in the autumn of 1933. He played his domestic league debut for the club in the home game on 26 November 1933 as Basel won 5–1 against Blue Stars Zürich. He scored his only goal for his club on 7 April 1934 in the test game at the Landhof against VfB Leipzig as Basel were defeated 1–7.

In the Basel season 1933–34 Chloupek played a total of 25 games for Basel. 18 of these games were in the Swiss Serie A, two in the Swiss Cup and five were friendly games.

After this season Chloupek moved onto Olympique Marseille for one season before returning home to play another year for Floridsdorfer AC. He then played two seasons for Wiener SC and finally moved onto SK Dürnkrut, where he ended his active football.

== Sources ==
- Rotblau: Jahrbuch Saison 2017/2018. Publisher: FC Basel Marketing AG. ISBN 978-3-7245-2189-1
- Die ersten 125 Jahre. Publisher: Josef Zindel im Friedrich Reinhardt Verlag, Basel. ISBN 978-3-7245-2305-5
- Verein "Basler Fussballarchiv" Homepage
- Stats FC Zurich
