= János Rémay =

Hungarian football player and manager

Personal information
- Full name: János Rémay
- Date of birth: 1 January 1903
- Place of birth: Torrington, Connecticut, United States
- Date of death: 2 November 1945 (aged 42)
- Place of death: Szeged, Hungary
- Position: Striker

Senior career*
| Years | Team | Apps | (Gls) |
| –1926 | Nemzeti SC | | |
| 1926–1930 | FC Mulhouse | | |
| 1930–1931 | US Thann | | |
| 1931–1932 | FC Basel | 3 | (0) |

International career
| 1925–1927 | Hungary | 6 | (1) |

Managerial career
- 1930–1931: US Thann
- 1945: FC Mulhouse
- * Club domestic league appearances and goals

János Rémay (1 January 1903 – 2 January 1945), also known as Josef or Joseph Remay, was a Hungarian football player and manager. He mainly played as striker, but was also a midfielder.

== Football career ==
Born in Austria-Hungary (or was he born in the USA?), Rémay played football for Nemzeti SC and was called up for the Hungarian national team during the 1924–25 season. He played his international debut on 18 January 1925 in the away game against Italy. He played six times for his country and scored one goal. This was on 14 February 1926 and the team won 2–0 in the away game against Belgium.

Later that year Rémay joined FC Mulhouse, where he played for four seasons. He was then employed as the first ever player-manager of lower tier US Thann in Thann, Haut-Rhin.

Rémay joined FC Basel's first team for their 1931–32 season. After playing in one test game, Rémay played his domestic league debut for the club in the home game in the St. Jakob Stadium on 30 August 1931 as Basel were defeated 1–4 by Young Fellows Zürich.

An episode that is noted in association with the Swiss Cup, was the second-round replay away against FC Lugano on 22 November 1931. The mood amongst the 3,000 spectators was heated even before the kick-off. This because after the 3–3 draw in the first game; the local press had circulated the most incredible rumours. Then, Basel's Alfred Schlecht scored the winning goal early, not even two minutes after the game had started. However, shortly before the end of the match referee Hans Wüthrich did not blow his whistle and award a penalty after an alleged handball by a Basel player. The referee ended the game shortly afterwards with a Basel victory and the ill tempers were worsened. After the game there were tumults and riots among the spectators who were not satisfied with the referee's performance. Stones were thrown at referee and players and the windows of the changing rooms were smashed. It was some eight hours later, before things were settled enough, for the police to able to bring both the referee and the entire Basel team to safety, by ship over Lake Lugano. According to the reports in the club chronicles, quite a few players were injured. Hermann Enderlin had a hole above his eye, Leopold Kielholz and goalkeeper Paul Blumer were also hurt. Remay himself also had a bleeding head. Lugano was sanctioned and had to play their next home games at least 100 kilometers from their home ground.

He played for the team for the first half of the season, before returning to Mulhouse. During this time Rémay played a total of seven games for Basel without scoring a goal. Three of these games were in the Nationalliga A, two in the Swiss Cup and two were friendly games.

During the Second World War, the teams from Alsace could not play within the French football system. Then after the war this changed again, the town Mulhouse became French again and rejoined the French football system. Rémay was appointed as coach of FC Mulhouse for the 1945–46 season, but soon afterwards on 2 November 1945 he died in Szeged, Hungary.

== Sources ==
- Rotblau: Jahrbuch Saison 2017/2018. Publisher: FC Basel Marketing AG. ISBN 978-3-7245-2189-1
- Die ersten 125 Jahre. Publisher: Josef Zindel im Friedrich Reinhardt Verlag, Basel. ISBN 978-3-7245-2305-5
- Verein "Basler Fussballarchiv" Homepage
