= Adolf Frey (footballer) =

Swiss footballer

Personal information
- Full name: Adolf Frey
- Date of birth: Switzerland
- Position: Striker

Senior career*
Years	Team	Apps	(Gls)
1931–1934	FC Basel	4	(1)
- * Club domestic league appearances and goals

Adolf Frey was a Swiss footballer who played for FC Basel during the 1930s. He played forward.

Frey joined Basel's first team in 1931. He played his domestic league debut for the club in the away game on 6 September 1931 as Basel were defeated Lugano. He scored his first goal for his club on 7 May 1933 in the away game as Basel were defeated 6–3 by Biel-Bienne.

Between the years 1931 and 1934 Frey played a total of seven games for Basel scoring a total of three goals. Four of these games were in the Swiss Serie A and three were friendly games. He scored one goal in the domestic league and the other two were scored during the test games.

== Sources ==
- Rotblau: Jahrbuch Saison 2017/2018. Publisher: FC Basel Marketing AG. ISBN 978-3-7245-2189-1
- Die ersten 125 Jahre. Publisher: Josef Zindel im Friedrich Reinhardt Verlag, Basel. ISBN 978-3-7245-2305-5
- Verein "Basler Fussballarchiv" Homepage
