= Paul Blumer =

Swiss association football player

Personal information
- Full name: Paul Blumer
- Place of birth: Switzerland
- Position: Goalkeeper

Senior career*
Years	Team	Apps	(Gls)
until 1931	SC Rheinfelden 03		
1931–1933	FC Basel	8	(0)
1933–	FC Bern		
- * Club domestic league appearances and goals

Paul Blumer was a Swiss footballer who played for FC Basel as a goalkeeper.

== Football career ==
Blumer started his football by Rheinfelden and in 1931 moved to FC Basel. Between the years 1931 and 1933 Blumer played a total of 18 games for Basel. Eight of these games were in the Swiss Serie A, three in the Swiss Cup and seven were friendly games.

An episode that is noted in association with the Swiss Cup, was the second-round replay away against FC Lugano on 22 November 1931. The mood amongst the 3,000 spectators was heated even before the kick-off. This because after the 3–3 draw in the first game; the local press had circulated the most incredible rumours. Then, Basel's Alfred Schlecht scored the winning goal early, not even two minutes after the game had started. However, shortly before the end of the match referee Hans Wüthrich did not blow his whistle and award a penalty after an alleged handball by a Basel player. The referee ended the game shortly afterwards with a Basel victory and the ill tempers were worsened. After the game there were tumults and riots among the spectators who were not satisfied with the referee's performance. Stones were thrown at referee and players and the windows of the changing rooms were smashed. It was some eight hours later, before things were settled enough, for the police to able to bring both the referee and the entire Basel team to safety, by ship over Lake Lugano. According to the reports in the club chronicles, quite a few players were injured. Josef Remay had a bleeding head, Hermann Enderlin had a hole above his eye, Leopold Kielholz and goalkeeper Blumer were also hurt.

== Sources ==
- Rotblau: Jahrbuch Saison 2017/2018. Publisher: FC Basel Marketing AG. ISBN 978-3-7245-2189-1
- Die ersten 125 Jahre. Publisher: Josef Zindel im Friedrich Reinhardt Verlag, Basel. ISBN 978-3-7245-2305-5
- Verein "Basler Fussballarchiv" Homepage
