= Hermann Enderlin =

Swiss-German footballer (1906-1973)

Personal information
- Full name: Hermann Enderlin
- Date of birth: 24 September 1906
- Date of death: 18 May 1973 (aged 66)
- Positions: Defender; midfielder

Senior career*
Years	Team	Apps	(Gls)
1926–1935	FC Basel	109	(0)
- * Club domestic league appearances and goals

Hermann Enderlin (* 24 September 1906; † 18 May 1973) was a Swiss-German footballer who played for FC Basel. He played mainly in the position of defender, but also as midfielder. He was known as Enderlin (II) because his brother Alfred Enderlin (I) played for Basel during the same period, but as a forward.

== Club career ==
Between the years 1926 and 1935 Enderlin (II) played a total of 182 games for Basel scoring just one goal. 109 of these games were in the Swiss Serie A, twenty in the Swiss Cup and 53 were friendly games. He scored his only goal during the test game in Norway, in Porsgrunn, against Urædd FK on 9 June 1930.

A well-documented curiosity was that at the end of Basel's 1929–30 season, the team set off on a Scandinavian football tour, including a visit to Germany. Six games were played in Norway, but the first was played in Leipzig. The team travelled with 15 players, their trainer Kertész and two functionaries. The journey started with a train ride on 2 June 1930 at quarter past seven in the morning from Basel and they arrived in Leipzig at half passed eight that evening. The game against VfB Leipzig was played the next evening. The following one and a half days were spent travelling by train, train, ship, train and train again to Drammen in Norway. Only a few hours after their arrival, the team played a game against a joint team Mjøndalen IF / SBK Drafn. The next day was a train journey to Porsgrunn and two matches in 24 hours. Following that they travelled per bus and then by ship in a 48-hour journey to Bergen for a match against SK Brann. Another ship voyage, this time to Stavanger, two games against Viking FK, then a ship voyage back to Bergen. Finally, the tour ended with three train journeys in three days, Bergen/Oslo/Berlin/Basel, arriving at home on 20 June. The result of this tour was seven games, four wins, one draw, two defeats and approximately 160 hours of travelling. Enderlin (II) was participant in this tour. He played in five games and scored that one goal.

An episode that is noted in association with the Swiss Cup, was the second-round replay away against FC Lugano on 22 November 1931. The mood amongst the 3,000 spectators was heated even before the kick-off. This because after the 3–3 draw in the first game; the local press had circulated the most incredible rumours. Then, Basel's Alfred Schlecht scored the winning goal early, not even two minutes after the game had started. However, shortly before the end of the match referee Hans Wüthrich did not blow his whistle and award a penalty after an alleged handball by a Basel player. The referee ended the game shortly afterwards with a Basel victory and the ill tempers were worsened. After the game there were tumults and riots among the spectators who were not satisfied with the referee's performance. Stones were thrown at referee and players and the windows of the changing rooms were smashed. It was some eight hours later, before things were settled enough, for the police to able to bring both the referee and the entire Basel team to safety, by ship over Lake Lugano. According to the reports in the club chronicles, quite a few players were injured. Josef Remay had a bleeding head, Leopold Kielholz and goalkeeper Paul Blumer were also hurt. Enderlin himself had a hole above his eye. Lugano was sanctioned and had to play their home games at least 100 kilometers from their home ground.

He was a member of the Basel team that won the Swiss Cup in the 1932–33 season. The final was played in the Hardturm stadium against Grasshopper Club. Basel won 4–3 and this was the club's first ever national title.

== Honours ==
- Swiss Cup winner: 1932–33

== Sources ==
- Rotblau: Jahrbuch Saison 2017/2018. Publisher: FC Basel Marketing AG. ISBN 978-3-7245-2189-1
