= Leopold Kielholz =

Swiss footballer (1911-1980)

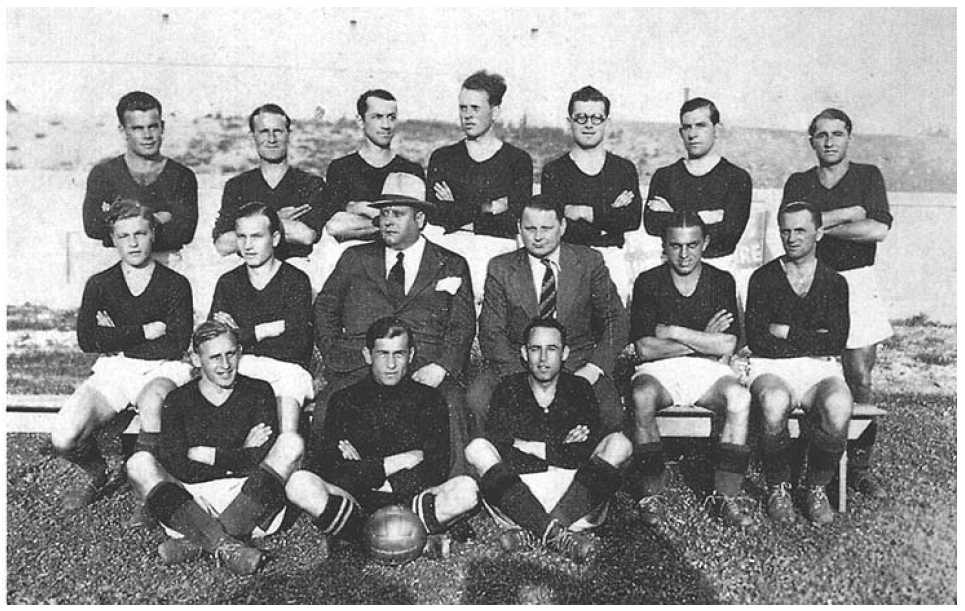

Personal information
- Date of birth: 9 June 1911
- Place of birth: Basel, Switzerland
- Date of death: 4 June 1980 (aged 68)
- Place of death: Zürich, Switzerland
- Position: Striker

Senior career*
Years	Team	Apps	(Gls)
1927–1928	BSC Old Boys		
1928–1930	Black Stars Basel		
1930–1932	Basel	34	(23)
1932–1935	Servette		
1935–1936	FC Bern		
1936–1937	Reims		
1937–1938	St. Gallen		
1938–1943	Young Fellows Juventus		

International career
1933–1938	Switzerland	17	(12)

Managerial career
- 1936–1937: Reims
- 1950–1953: Switzerland
- 1954–1958: Switzerland
- * Club domestic league appearances and goals

Leopold "Poldi" Kielholz (9 June 1911 – 4 June 1980) was a Swiss football striker. He participated in the 1934 FIFA World Cup, scoring 3 goals, and also in the 1938 FIFA World Cup. Historically, he was the first Swiss international to score a goal for his country in a World Cup tournament. He was known for wearing glasses during games.

== Football career ==
=== Club ===
Leopold Kielholz started his footballing career by BSC Old Boys Basel. A year later he transferred to Black Stars Basel and another two years later to FC Basel.

A well-documented curiosity was that at the end of Basel's 1929–30 season, the team set off on a Scandinavian football tour, including a visit to Germany. Six games were played in Norway, but the first was played in Leipzig. The team travelled with 15 players, their trainer Kertész and two functionaries. The journey started with a train ride on 2 June 1930 at quarter past seven in the morning from Basel and they arrived in Leipzig at half passed eight that evening. The game against VfB Leipzig was played the next evening. The following one and a half days were spent travelling by train, train, ship, train and train again to Drammen in Norway. Only a few hours after their arrival, the team played a game against a joint team Mjøndalen IF / SBK Drafn. The next day was a train journey to Porsgrunn and two matches in 24 hours. Following that they travelled per bus and then by ship in a 48-hour journey to Bergen for a match against SK Brann. Another ship voyage, this time to Stavanger, two games against Viking FK, then a ship voyage back to Bergen. Finally, the tour ended with three train journeys in three days, Bergen/Oslo/Berlin/Basel, arriving at home on 20 June. The result of this tour was seven games, four wins, one draw, two defeats and approximately 160 hours of travelling. Kielholz was participant in this tour. He played in five games and scored a goal.

An episode that is noted in association with the Swiss Cup, was the second-round replay away against FC Lugano on 22 November 1931. The mood amongst the 3,000 spectators was heated even before the kick-off. This because after the 3–3 draw in the first game; the local press had circulated the most incredible rumours. Then, Basel's Alfred Schlecht scored the winning goal early, not even two minutes after the game had started. However, shortly before the end of the match referee Hans Wüthrich did not blow his whistle and award a penalty after an alleged handball by a Basel player. The referee ended the game shortly afterwards with a Basel victory and the ill tempers were worsened. After the game there were tumults and riots among the spectators who were not satisfied with the referee's performance. Stones were thrown at referee and players and the windows of the changing rooms were smashed. It was some eight hours later, before things were settled enough, for the police to able to bring both the referee and the entire Basel team to safety, by ship over Lake Lugano. According to the reports in the club chronicles, quite a few players were injured. Josef Remay had a bleeding head, Hermann Enderlin had a hole above his eye, goalkeeper Paul Blumer and Kielholz himself were also hurt. Lugano was sanctioned and had to play their next home games at least 100 kilometers from their home ground.

Between the years 1930 and 1932 Kielholz played a total of 51 games for Basel scoring a total of 39 goals. 34 of these games were in the Swiss Seirie A, five in the Swiss Cup and 12 were friendly games. He scored 23 goals in the domestic league, four in the cup and the other 12 were scored during the test games.

In 1932 Kielholz transferred to Servette. The clubs that he played for while participating in these two World Cup tournaments were FC Servette and Young Fellows Juventus. He also played for Stade de Reims between 1936 and 1937.

=== International ===
Kielholz gave his made his debut for the Swiss national team in 1933. He played a total of 17 games and scored 12 goals for Switzerland. His last international game was in 1938 against Belgium.

=== Coaching career ===
Kielholz coached Stade de Reims from 1936 to 1937 as a player-manager and twice the Swiss nation team, between 1950 and 1953 and again between 1954 and 1958.

=== Titles and Honours ===
- Central European International Cup top scorer: 1933–35
- Swiss League Champion: 1932–33, 1933–34
- Swiss League Top Goalscorer: 1933–34

== See also ==
- List of FC Basel players
- List of FC Basel seasons
- Football in Switzerland

== Sources ==
- Rotblau: Jahrbuch Saison 2017/2018. Publisher: FC Basel Marketing AG. ISBN 978-3-7245-2189-1
- Die ersten 125 Jahre. Publisher: Josef Zindel im Friedrich Reinhardt Verlag, Basel. ISBN 978-3-7245-2305-5
- Verein "Basler Fussballarchiv" Homepage
