= Hans Wüthrich =

Football player and referee (1889–1982)

Hans Wüthrich (1 November 1889 – 13 August 1982) was a Swiss footballer and later referee.

As a footballer Wüthrich played for Concordia Basel and Yverdon-Sports. He also played for the Switzerland national team. He played in the game on 18 May 1913 as the Swiss won by two goals to one in Freiburg im Breisgau against Germany.

After his active football career Wüthrich became a referee. During his time, he refereed the Swiss Cup Finals in 1934, 1937 and 1940 and in 1944 for the fourth time.

An episode that is noted in association with the Swiss Cup, was the second-round replay between FC Lugano and FC Basel on 22 November 1931. The mood amongst the 3,000 spectators was heated even before the kick-off. This because after the 3–3 draw in the first game; the local press had circulated the most incredible rumours. Then, Basel's Alfred Schlecht scored the winning goal early, not even two minutes after the game had started. However, shortly before the end of the match referee Wüthrich did not blow his whistle and award a penalty after an alleged handball by a Basel player. He ended the game shortly afterwards with a Basel victory and the ill tempers were worsened. After the game there were tumults and riots among the spectators who were not satisfied with the referee's performance. Stones were thrown at referee and players and the windows of the changing rooms were smashed. It was some eight hours later before things were settled enough for the police to able to bring both the referee and the entire Basel team to safety, by ship over Lake Lugano. According to the reports in the FCB chronicles, quite a few players were injured. Josef Remay had a bleeding head, Hermann Enderlin had a hole above his eye, Leopold Kielholz and goalkeeper Paul Blumer were also hurt. Wüthrich escaped unhurt. Lugano was sanctioned and had to play their home games at least 100 kilometers from their home ground.

Wüthrich was the first Swiss match official to be appointed to a FIFA World Cup final match when he was selected to run the line in the 1938 final match between Italy and Hungary] in Paris. Wüthrich had already officiated in three matches prior to the final, acting as match referee in the semi-final between Italy and Brazil in Marseille and also running the line in the notorious game between the hosts France and Italy in Paris, the game in which the Italians wore the maglia nera, a gesture of fascist defiance and provocation.

Wüthrich's performances, importantly, escaped criticism; a fillip to the reputation of his country's referees after the controversy which had surrounded Rene Mercet in the 1934 FIFA World Cup.
