= Alfred Schlecht =

Swiss footballer (1903-1986)

Personal information
- Full name: Alfred Schlecht
- Date of birth: 11 June 1903
- Place of birth: Switzerland
- Date of death: 14 January 1986 (aged 82)
- Place of death: Switzerland
- Position: Striker

Youth career
- FC Basel

Senior career*
Years	Team	Apps	(Gls)
1922–1924	FC Basel	8	(4)
1924–1925	Nordstern Basel		
1925–1936	FC Basel	128	(70)
- * Club domestic league appearances and goals

Alfred Schlecht (11 June 1903 – 14 January 1986) was a Swiss footballer who played for FC Basel and Nordstern Basel. He played mainly in the position of striker, but also as a midfielder.

== Football career ==
Schlecht played youth football and moved up to the senior team of FC Basel in 1922. He played his first game for the team on 31 December 1922, a test game against Schaffhausen. He played his domestic league debut on 18 February 1923 and scored his first goal for the club during the same game as Basel defeated Luzern 2–0. He also played for Basel in the next season, but moved on to Nordstern Basel for the 1924–25 season.

After that season Schlecht returned to Basel and played for them for another 11 seasons. He scored his first hat-trick in an away game as Basel won 7–2 against Solothurn on 16 December 1928. Against the same team, nearly one year later on 10 November 1929, in the same stadium, Schlecht scored four goals in the game that Basel won 5–1.

A well-documented curiosity was that at the end of Basel's 1929–30 season, the team set off on a Scandinavian football tour, including a visit to Germany. Six games were played in Norway, but the first was played in Leipzig. The team travelled with 15 players, their trainer Kertész and two functionaries. The journey started with a train ride on 2 June 1930 at quarter past seven in the morning from Basel and they arrived in Leipzig at half passed eight that evening. The game against VfB Leipzig was played the next evening. The following one and a half days were spent travelling by train, train, ship, train and train again to Drammen in Norway. Only a few hours after their arrival, the team played a game against a joint team Mjøndalen IF / SBK Drafn. The next day was a train journey to Porsgrunn and two matches in 24 hours. Following that they travelled per bus and then by ship in a 48-hour journey to Bergen for a match against SK Brann. Another ship voyage, this time to Stavanger, two games against Viking FK, then a ship voyage back to Bergen. Finally, the tour ended with three train journeys in three days, Bergen/Oslo/Berlin/Basel, arriving at home on 20 June. The result of this tour was seven games, four wins, one draw, two defeats and approximately 160 hours of travelling. Schecht ended his voyage early, however, and returned home after the game against SK Brann because his employer had only granted him two weeks holidays. He played the first five games and scored three goals.

An episode that is noted in association with the Swiss Cup, was the second-round replay away against FC Lugano on 22 November 1931. The mood amongst the 3,000 spectators was heated even before the kick-off. This because after the 3–3 draw in the first game; the local press had circulated the most incredible rumours. Then, Schlecht himself scored the winning goal early, not even two minutes after the game had started. However, shortly before the end of the match referee Hans Wüthrich did not blow his whistle and award a penalty after an alleged handball by a Basel player. The referee ended the game shortly afterwards with a Basel victory and the ill tempers were worsened. After the game there were tumults and riots among the spectators who were not satisfied with the referee's performance. Stones were thrown at referee and players and the windows of the changing rooms were smashed. It was some eight hours before things were settled enough for the police to able to bring both the referee and the entire Basel team to safety, by ship over Lake Lugano. According to the reports in the club chronicles, quite a few players were injured. Josef Remay had a bleeding head, Hermann Enderlin had a hole above his eye, Leopold Kielholz and goalkeeper Paul Blumer were also hurt. Schlecht escaped unhurt. Lugano was sanctioned and had to play their next home games at least 100 kilometers from their home ground.

He played his last game for the club in the 1935–36 Nationalliga season on 24 November 1935 against Young Fellows Zürich. Between the seasons 1922/23 and 1935/36 Schlecht played a total of 206 games for Basel scoring a total of 107 goals. 128 of these games were in the Swiss Serie A and Nationalliga, 17 in the Swiss Cup and 53 were friendly games. He scored 74 goals in the domestic league, 10 in the cup and the other 23 were scored during the test games. He was the team's top goal scorer during the season 1929/30.

== Sources ==
- Rotblau: Jahrbuch Saison 2017/2018. Publisher: FC Basel Marketing AG. ISBN 978-3-7245-2189-1
- Die ersten 125 Jahre. Publisher: Josef Zindel im Friedrich Reinhardt Verlag, Basel. ISBN 978-3-7245-2305-5
- Verein "Basler Fussballarchiv" Homepage
