= 1934–35 BSC Young Boys season =

BSC Young Boys
1934–35 season
- Manager: Hans Wüthrich
- Stadium: Stadion Wankdorf
- Nationalliga: 12th
- Swiss Cup: Round 3
- Top goalscorer: League: Paul Schmid (7); All: Paul Schmid (7)
- Biggest win: Young Boys 12–0 Villeneuve-Sports
- Biggest defeat: FC Bern 5–0 Young Boys

The 1934–35 season was the 36th season in the history of Berner Sport Club Young Boys. The team played their home games at Stadion Wankdorf in Bern, placing 12th in the Nationalliga, and being eliminated in the 3rd round of the Swiss Cup.

== Players ==
- Riesen
- Achille Siegrist
- Voléry
- Fritz Lehmann
- John Hürbin
- Hans Liniger
- Charlie Handley
- Albert Guerne
- Hediger
- Thomann
- Paul Schmid

== Competitions ==
Win Draw Loss

=== Overall record ===
Competition	First match	Last match	Starting round	Final position	Record							
Competition	First match	Last match	Starting round	Final position	Pld	W	D	L	GF	GA	GD	Win %
Nationalliga	26 August 1934	22 May 1935	Matchday 1	12th	26	6	5	15	46	72	−26	23.08
Swiss Cup	7 October 1934	2 December 1934	1st principal round	Round 3	4	2	1	1	18	3	+15	50.00
Total					30	8	6	16	64	75	−11	26.67

Source: Competitions

=== Nationalliga ===
==== League table ====
Pos	Team	Pld	W	D	L	GF	GA	GD	Pts	Qualification or relegation
10	La Chaux-de-Fonds	26	10	3	13	47	48	−1	23	
11	Nordstern Basel	26	8	5	13	48	49	−1	21	
12	Young Boys	26	6	5	15	46	72	−26	17	
13	Concordia Basel	26	5	4	17	36	79	−43	14	Relegated to 1935–36 1. Liga
14	Etoile Carouge	26	2	2	22	14	85	−71	6	Relegated to 1935–36 1. Liga

Source: rsssf.com
Rules for classification: 1) Points; 2) Goal difference within the league, however with play-off for qualifiers;

==== Matches ====
26 August 1934 Round 1	Basel	4–1	Young Boys	Landhof, Basel
10:15	Schaub (1:1); Schlecht 32' (2:1); Haftl 46' (3:1); Siegrist 69' (o.g. 4:1)	Summary	7' (0:1) Guerne	Attendance: 3,500; Referee: (Switzerland) Enderli Winterthur

2 September 1934 Round 2	Young Boys	1–1	Locarno	Bern
				Stadium: Stadion Wankdorf; Attendance: 3,000; Referee: (Switzerland) Hugo Neumann

9 September 1934 Round 3	Young Boys	2–5	Lausanne-Sport	Bern
				Stadium: Stadion Wankdorf; Attendance: 4,000; Referee: (Switzerland) Hans Enderli

15 September 1934 Round 4	Nordstern Basel	4–4	Young Boys	Basel
				Stadium: Stadion Rankhof; Attendance: 4,000; Referee: (Switzerland) Willy Dagon

23 September 1934 Round 5	Young Boys	0–4	FC Bern	Bern
				Stadium: Stadion Wankdorf; Attendance: 6,000; Referee: (Switzerland) Rodolphe Wittwer

30 September 1934 Round 6	Young Boys	2–6	Servette	Bern
				Stadium: Stadion Wankdorf; Attendance: 2,000; Referee: (Switzerland) Walter Jordan

21 October 1934 Round 7	Lugano	2–0	Young Boys	Lugano
				Stadium: Campo Marzio; Attendance: 1,000; Referee: (Switzerland) Walter Jordan

28 October 1934 Round 8	Young Fellows Zürich	2–1	Young Boys	Zürich
				Stadium: Stadion Förrlibuck; Attendance: 2,000; Referee: (Switzerland) Hans Enderli

25 November 1934 Round 9	La Chaux-de-Fonds	4–1	Young Boys	La Chaux-de-Fonds
				Stadium: Parc des Sports; Attendance: 1,200; Referee: (Switzerland) Paul Schrumpf

9 December 1934 Round 10	Biel-Bienne	3–1	Young Boys	Biel/Bienne
				Stadium: Stadion Gurzelen; Attendance: 3,000; Referee: (Switzerland) Rohner

16 December 1934 Round 11	Young Boys	3–1	Etoile-Carouge FC	Bern
				Stadium: Stadion Wankdorf; Attendance: 2,500; Referee: (Switzerland) Alfred Spengler

23 December 1934 Round 12	FC Concordia Basel	2–2	Young Boys	Basel
				Stadium: Stadion Schützenmatte; Attendance: 2,500; Referee: (Switzerland) Rodolphe Wittwer

30 December 1934 Round 13	Young Boys	3–2	Grasshopper Club Zürich	Bern
				Stadium: Stadion Wankdorf; Attendance: 5,000; Referee: (Switzerland) Rodolphe Wittwer

6 January 1935 Round 14	Young Boys	4–4	Basel	Wankdorf Stadium, Bern
	Rufer 10' (1:1); Samek 26' (2:2); Schmid 53' (3:3); Artimovicz 76' (4:3)	Summary	8' (0:1) Schlecht (1:2) Hufschmid; 51' (2:3) Hufschmid (4:4) Haftl	Attendance: 6,000; Referee: (Switzerland) Spengler Olten

13 January 1935 Round 15	Locarno	3–1	Young Boys	Locarno
				Stadium: Stadio del Lido; Attendance: 800; Referee: (Switzerland) Sigmund Bitterli

20 January 1935 Round 16	Lausanne-Sport	4–4	Young Boys	Lausanne
				Stadium: Stade olympique de la Pontaise; Attendance: 2,200; Referee: (Switzerland) William Bangerter

10 February 1935 Round 17	Young Boys	1–0	Nordstern Basel	Bern
				Stadium: Stadion Wankdorf; Attendance: 2,500; Referee: (Switzerland) Alfred Spengler

17 February 1935 Round 18	FC Bern	5–0	Young Boys	Bern
				Stadium: Stadion Neufeld; Attendance: 6,000; Referee: (Switzerland) Felix Herren

24 February 1935 Round 19	Servette	3–2	Young Boys	Geneva
				Stadium: Charmilles Stadium; Attendance: 3,000; Referee: (Switzerland) Walter Jordan

10 March 1935 Round 20	Young Boys	4–0	Lugano	Bern
				Stadium: Stadion Wankdorf; Attendance: 3,000; Referee: (Switzerland) Rodolphe Wittwer

24 March 1935 Round 21	Young Boys	0–3	Young Fellows Zürich	Bern
				Stadium: Stadion Wankdorf; Attendance: 4,000; Referee: (Switzerland) Willy Dagon

17 March 1935 Round 22	Young Boys	3–2	La Chaux-de-Fonds	Bern
				Stadium: Stadion Wankdorf; Attendance: 3,500; Referee: (Switzerland) Hans Enderli

7 April 1935 Round 23	Young Boys	0–1	Biel-Bienne	Bern
				Stadium: Stadion Wankdorf; Attendance: 5,000; Referee: (Switzerland) Eugen Scherz

28 April 1935 Round 24	Etoile-Carouge FC	2–1	Young Boys	Carouge
				Stadium: Stade de la Fontenette; Attendance: 1,000; Referee: (Switzerland) Willy Dagon

12 May 1935 Round 25	Young Boys	2–0	FC Concordia Basel	Bern
				Stadium: Stadion Wankdorf; Attendance: 6,000; Referee: (Switzerland) Alfred Spengler

22 May 1935 Round 26	Grasshopper Club Zürich	5–3	Young Boys	Zürich
				Stadium: Hardturm; Attendance: 1,500; Referee: (Switzerland) Paul Schrumpf

=== Swiss Cup ===
7 October 1934 1st principal round	Young Boys	12–0	Villeneuve-Sports	Bern
				Stadium: Stadion Wankdorf

18 November 1934 Round 2	Aarau	1–1 (a.e.t.)	Young Boys	Aarau
				Stadium: Stadion Brügglifeld

1 December 1934 Round 2 replay	Young Boys	4–0	Aarau	Bern
				Stadium: Stadion Wankdorf

2 December 1934 Round 3	Young Boys	1–2 (a.e.t.)	Servette	Bern
				Stadium: Stadion Wankdorf

== Statistics ==
=== Goalscorers ===
- Paul Schmid 7
- Josef Artimovics 6
- Kastl 5
- Walter Rufer 3
- (England) Charles Harold James Handley 2
- Hermann Springer 2
- Ferdinand Samek 2
- Max Horisberger 2
- Achille Siegrist 1
- Fritz Lehmann 1
- Ernst Schreyer 1
- Own goal 2
