= 1933–34 BSC Young Boys season =

BSC Young Boys
1933–34 season
- Manager: Hans Wüthrich
- Stadium: Stadion Wankdorf
- Nationalliga: 9th
- Swiss Cup: 1st principal round
- Highest home attendance: 12,000 vs FC Bern
- Biggest win: Young Boys 10–0 Blue Stars Zürich
- Biggest defeat: Lugano 5–0 Young Boys

The 1933–34 season was the 35th season in the history of Berner Sport Club Young Boys. The team played their home games at Stadion Wankdorf in Bern.

== Overview ==
In the domestic cup, Young Boys received a bye to the 1st principal round where they were defeated at home against Nordstern Basel.

== Players ==
- Moggio
- Achille Siegrist
- Voléry
- Bertram Smith
- Mario Fasson
- Emil Messerli
- Best
- Erwin Hochstrasser
- Imrie
- Fritz Lehmann
- Herzog
- (England) Charlie Handley

== Friendlies ==
Win Draw Loss

29 October 1933 Friendly	Young Boys (Switzerland)	1–2	(Switzerland) Servette	Bern
			Tax; Laube	Stadium: Stadion Wankdorf

== Competitions ==
=== Overall record ===
Competition	First match	Last match	Starting round	Final position	Record							
Competition	First match	Last match	Starting round	Final position	Pld	W	D	L	GF	GA	GD	Win %
Nationalliga	27 August 1933	30 June 1934	Matchday 1	9th	30	13	4	13	73	65	+8	43.33
Swiss Cup	1 October 1933		1st principal round	1st principal round	1	0	0	1	1	2	−1	0.00
Total					31	13	4	14	74	67	+7	41.94

Source: Competitions

=== Nationalliga ===
1933/34 was the first season in which all teams played in a round-robin format. Before that, it was played in groups, and the Swiss champion was chosen via a play-off.

==== League table ====
Pos	Team	Pld	W	D	L	GF	GA	GD	Pts
7	FC Biel	30	14	4	12	78	68	+10	32
8	FC Nordstern Basel	30	13	5	12	57	66	−9	31
9	BSC Young Boys	30	13	4	13	73	65	+8	30
10	FC Concordia Basel	30	11	5	14	64	71	−7	27
11	FC Locarno	30	11	5	14	57	66	−9	27

Source: rsssf.com

==== Matches ====
27 August 1933 1	Young Fellows Zürich	1–2	Young Boys	Zürich
	Harry O'Neill 76'		Imrie 71'; Best 78'	Stadium: Stadion Förrlibuck; Attendance: 2,000; Referee: Walter Jordan

3 September 1933 2	Zürich	0–1	Young Boys	Zürich
			Herzog 655'	Stadium: Letzigrund; Attendance: 3,800; Referee: Hugo Neumann

10 September 1933 3	Young Boys	2–0	Nordstern Basel	Bern
	Charlie Handley 20', 25'			Stadium: Stadion Wankdorf; Attendance: 4,000; Referee: William Bangerter

8 October 1933 4	Young Boys	1–1	Lugano	Bern
				Stadium: Stadion Wankdorf; Attendance: 4,500; Referee: Ferdinand Allemann

15 October 1933 5	Grasshopper Club Zürich	5–2	Young Boys	Zürich
				Stadium: Hardturm; Attendance: 9,000; Referee: Hans Enderli

22 October 1933 6	Young Boys	2–2	FC Bern	Bern
				Stadium: Stadion Wankdorf; Attendance: 12,000; Referee: Rodolphe Wittwer

12 November 1933 7	Young Boys	1–1	Basel	Wankdorf Stadium, Bern
	Schicker 70' (1:1)	Summary	65' (0:1) Jaeck	Attendance: 4,500; Referee: (Switzerland) Brüschweiler Zürich

26 November 1933 8	Servette	5–1	Young Boys	Geneva
				Stadium: Charmilles Stadium; Attendance: 3,000; Referee: Felix Herren

17 December 1933 9	Young Boys	4–5	Urania Genève Sport	Bern
				Stadium: Stadion Wankdorf; Attendance: 1,000; Referee: Karl Wunderlin

24 December 1933 10	Lausanne-Sport	1–1	Young Boys	Lausanne
				Stadium: Stade olympique de la Pontaise; Attendance: 3,000; Referee: Paul Schrumpf

31 December 1933 11	Young Boys	10–0	Blue Stars Zürich	Bern
				Stadium: Stadion Wankdorf; Attendance: 2,700; Referee: Walter Jordan

7 January 1934 12	Young Boys	3–2	La Chaux-de-Fonds	Bern
				Stadium: Stadion Wankdorf; Attendance: 4,000; Referee: Ernest Meyer

21 January 1934 13	FC Biel	0–3	Young Boys	Biel/Bienne
				Stadium: Stadion Gurzelen; Attendance: 4,500

14 January 1934 14	FC Concordia Basel	5–2	Young Boys	Basel
				Stadium: Stadion Schützenmatte; Attendance: 4,000; Referee: Saly Rosenbaum

28 January 1934 15	Locarno	2–1	Young Boys	Locarno
				Stadium: Stadio del Lido; Attendance: 1,500; Referee: Walter Jordan

11 February 1934 16	Young Boys	1–2	Young Fellows Zürich	Bern
				Stadium: Stadion Wankdorf; Attendance: 3,000; Referee: Felix Herren

18 February 1934 17	Young Boys	4–1	Zürich	Bern
				Stadium: Stadion Wankdorf; Attendance: 3,000; Referee: Charles Schwaar

25 February 1934 18	Nordstern Basel	3–2	Young Boys	Basel
				Stadium: Stadion Rankhof; Attendance: 7,000; Referee: Mercet

18 March 1934 19	FC Bern	1–0	Young Boys	Bern
				Stadium: Stadion Neufeld; Attendance: 6,000; Referee: Rodolphe Wittwer

8 April 1934 20	Young Boys	1–4	Grasshopper Club Zürich	Bern
				Stadium: Stadion Wankdorf; Attendance: 5,500; Referee: Hans Enderli

15 April 1934 21	Lugano	5–0	Young Boys	Lugano
				Stadium: Campo Marzio; Attendance: 3,000; Referee: Willy Dagon

22 April 1934 22	Young Boys	6–1	Locarno	Bern
				Stadium: Stadion Wankdorf; Attendance: 4,000; Referee: Alfred Spengler

28 April 1934 23	Blue Stars Zürich	0–2	Young Boys	Zürich
				Stadium: Hardhof; Attendance: 1,500; Referee: Ferdinand Allemann

6 May 1934 24	Young Boys	3–5	Servette	Bern
				Stadium: Stadion Wankdorf; Attendance: 5,000; Referee: Felix Herren

13 May 1934 25	Urania Genève Sport	1–2	Young Boys	Cologny
				Stadium: Stade de Frontenex; Attendance: 1,000; Referee: Hans Enderli

21 May 1934 26	Young Boys	4–6	Lausanne-Sport	Bern
				Stadium: Stadion Wankdorf; Attendance: 3,500; Referee: Paul Speidel

27 May 1934 29	Young Boys	3–0	FC Biel	Bern
				Stadium: Stadion Wankdorf; Attendance: 2,500; Referee: Alfred Spengler

10 June 1934 28	La Chaux-de-Fonds	0–3	Young Boys	La Chaux-de-Fonds
				Stadium: Parc des Sports; Attendance: 1,000; Referee: Felix Herren

23 June 1934 30	Young Boys	4–3	FC Concordia Basel	Bern
				Stadium: Stadion Wankdorf; Attendance: 1,000; Referee: Rodolphe Wittwer

30 June 1934 27	Basel	3–2	Young Boys	Landhof, Basel
17:00	Müller 2' (1:1); Haftl 66' (2:2); Schlecht 75' (3:2)	Summary	1' (0:1) Hediger; 57' (1:2) Hediger	Attendance: 2,000; Referee: (Switzerland) Meyer Lausanne

=== Swiss Cup ===
1 October 1933 1st principal round	Young Boys	1–2	Nordstern Basel	Bern
				Stadium: Stadion Wankdorf
