= 1934–35 Swiss Cup =

Tournament details
- Country: Switzerland

Final positions
- Champions: Lausanne-Sport
- Runners-up: Nordstern Basel

The 1934–35 Swiss Cup was the 10th edition of Switzerland's football cup competition, organised annually since the 1925–26 season by the Swiss Football Association.

== Overview ==
This season's cup competition began with three preliminary rounds. These were played during the last few week-ends of August 1934. The first principal round was played at the beginning of October. The competition was to be completed on Sunday 19 May 1935, with the final, which this year was held at the Pontaise in Lausanne.

The preliminary rounds were held for the lower league teams that were not qualified for the main rounds. Reserve teams were not admitted to the competition. The 14 clubs from the 1934–35 Nationalliga and the 22 clubs from this season's 1. Liga joined the competition in the first principal round, which was played on Sunday 7 October.

The matches were played in a knockout format. In the event of a draw after 90 minutes, the match went into extra time. In the event of a draw at the end of extra time, if agreed between the clubs, a second extra time was played, or a replay was foreseen and this was played on the visiting team's pitch. If the replay ended in a draw after extra time, it would require another replay. However, if a replay had not been agreed, a toss of a coin would establish the team that qualified for the next round.

== Preliminary rounds ==
The lower league teams that had not qualified for the competition competed here in three preliminary knockout rounds. Reserve teams were not admitted to the competition. The aim of this preliminary stage was to reduce the number of lower league teams to 28 before the first main round, to join the 36 clubs from the top two tiers. The draw in these rounds respected local regionalities. The preliminary rounds were played during August, a few in September, but all in advance of the lower leagues regional season.

=== First preliminary round ===
Team 1	Score	Team 2
12 August 1934
FC Floria (La Chaux-de-Fonds)	1–6; Annulled *	Le Parc La Chaux-de-Fonds
Prilly Sport	2–1	FC Vignoble Cully
FC Oerlikon (ZH)	6–1	FC Thalwil
FC Muhen	0–2	FC Hakoah Zürich
FC Gwatt	2–4	Zähringia Bern
FC Langenthal	2–6	FC Nidau
Delémont	2–0	FC Reconvilier
FC Birsfelden	3–1	Moutier
Rasenspiele Basel	1–2	US Bottecchia Basel

- Note to match Floria-Le Parc: The result was annulled and awarded forfeit 3–0 victory for FC Floria.

=== Second preliminary round ===
Team 1	Score	Team 2
19 August 1934
CA Genève	0–5	CS La Tour-de-Peilz
Lancy-Sports	3–2	Prilly Sport
Sion	7–3	Stade Lausanne
Villeneuve-Sports (t)	4–4 (a.e.t.) *	FC Renens
Martigny-Sports	4–3; Annulled *	Chênois
Vevey Sports	5–1	FC Gardy-Jonction
USI Dopolavoro Genève	3–0	Concordia Yverdon
FC Sierre	8–5	Stade Nyonnais
FC Floria (La Chaux-de-Fonds)	3–2	Comète Peseux
Étoile-Sporting	FF * Awd 0–3	FC Orbe
FC Le Sentier	0–1	Richemond-Daillettes (FR)
Sylva-Sports (Le Locle)	5–1	Sainte-Croix-Sports
FC Stade Payerne	5–2	FC Morat
FC Fleurier	0–3	FC Gloria (Le Locle)
FC La Neuveville	0–1	FC Xamax (Neuchâtel)
FC Saint-Imier	4–3	Central Fribourg
FC Langnau am Albis (ZH)	1–3	FC Wiedikon
FC Dietikon	3–4	Kickers Luzern
FC Lenzburg	2–0	FC Hakoah Zürich
FC Wipklingen (ZH)	5–4	Baden
Wohlen	2–1	FC Altstetten (Zürich)
SC Luzern	2–1	FC Diana (Zürich)
Zofingen	5–3	SC Zug
FC Industrie (ZH)	4–1	Red Star
FC Adliswil	4–3	FC Oerlikon (ZH)
FC Wädenswil	3–1	FC Lachen
SV Höngg	0–2	FC Horgen
Brugg	2–5	FC Buchs (AG)
FC Elvezia	1–2	SC Balerna
US Bienne-Boujean	4–1	FC Madretsch (Biel)
Thun	1–4	FC Helvetia Bern
FC Gerlafingen	13–1	Lengnau
FC Lerchenfeld (Thun)	0–3	SC Derendingen
Burgdorf	4–7	FC Aurore Bienne
Sport Boys Bern	0–1	Zähringia Bern
FC Nidau	8–0	FC Länggasse (Bern)
FC Biberist	2–3	FC Viktoria Bern
FC Langnau im Emmental (BE)	7–2	Minerva Bern
Fulgor Grenchen	3–4	FC Tramelan
FC Helvetik (Basel)	0–1	SC Keleinhüningen
SV Sissach	1–0	Sportfreunde Basel
Dornach	2–4	FC Porrentruy
FC Liestal	11–0	Olympia Basel
FC Allschwil	5–0	FC Breite (Basel)
Laufen	2–3	US Bottecchia Basel
Delémont	Abd *	Black Stars
26 August 1934
FC Rohrschach	0–7	FC Töss (Winterthur)
FC Neuhausen	1–4	Uster
Arbon	3–1	FC Tössfeld (Winterthur)
FC Romanshorn	5–3	FC St. Margarethen
Frauenfeld	3–0	FC Herisau
SV Schaffhausen	5–0	FC Phönix (Winterthur)
FC Fortuna (SG)	0–0 (a.e.t.)	FC Weinfelden

- Note (t): Match Villeneuve–Renens no replay was agreed between the two teams. Villeneuve-Sports qualified on toss of a coin.
- Note to match Martigny-Chênois: The result was annulled and awarded forfeit 3–0 victory for Chênois.
- Note to match Étoile-Sporting–Orbe: Étoile-Sporting declaied forfeit and the match was awarded forfeit 3–0 victory for Orbe. Étoile-Sporting withdrew in championship and in cup.
- Note to match Delémont–Black Stars: the match was abandoned due to a fault of the referee and was replayed

Replays

Team 1	Score	Team 2
26 August 1934
Delémont	2–4	Black Stars
2 September 1934
FC Weinfelden	5–4	FC Fortuna (SG)

=== Third preliminary round ===
Team 1	Score	Team 2
26 August 1934
Vevey Sports	5–1	FC Xamax (Neuchâtel)
FC Saint-Imier	4–3 (a.e.t.)	Sylva-Sports (Le Locle)
FC Orbe	1–4	Richemond-Daillettes (FR)
USI Dopolavoro Genève	9–1	FC Stade Payerne
FC Gloria (Le Locle)	2–2 (a.e.t.)	CS La Tour-de-Peilz
CS La Tour-de-Peilz	4–4 (a.e.t.) *	FC Gloria (Le Locle) (t)
US Bienne-Boujean	4–2	FC Aurore Bienne
Villeneuve-Sports	4–1	FC Floria (La Chaux-de-Fonds)
FC Nidau	4–3	FC Tramelan
FC Lenzburg	1–3	Baden
FC Horgen	1–7	Kickers Luzern
FC Wiedikon	2–5	Wohlen
Luzern	3–8	FC Adliswil
FC Wädenswil	3–0	FC Industrie (ZH)
Zofingen	5–0	FC Buchs (AG)
SC Veltheim (Winterthur)	0–3	Winterthur
FC Liestal	0–1	FC Allschwil
FC Sissach	2–2 (a.e.t.)	US Bottecchia Basel
SC Kleinhüningen	7–0	FC Porrentruy
FC Helvetia Bern	1–3	SC Derendingen
FC Gerlafingen	4–2	FC Viktoria Bern
Zähringia Bern	2–4	FC Langnau im Emmental (BE)
FC Nidau	4–3	FC Tramelan
US Bienne-Boujean	4–2	FC Aurore Bienne
2 September 1934
FC Töss (Winterthur)	2–1	Uster
FC Romanshorn	1–3	Frauenfeld
SV Schaffhausen	1–4	Winterthur
16 September 1934
Lancy-Sports	1–6	FC Sierre
Arbon	2–0 (a.e.t.)	FC Weinfelden
SC Balerna	1–1 (a.e.t.)	GC Luganesi
Chênois	FF; Awd 3–0 *	Sion

- Note (t): Match La Tour-de-Peilz–FC Gloria no replay was agreed between the two teams. FC Gloria qualified on toss of a coin.
- Note to match Chênois–Sion: Sion declaied forfeit and the match was awarded forfeit 3–0 victory for Chênois

Replay

Team 1	Score	Team 2
2 September 1934
US Bottecchia Basel	6–0	FC Sissach
6 October 1934
GC Luganesi	6–0	SC Balerna

== First principal round ==
=== Summary ===
Team 1	Score	Team 2
7 October 1934
SC Derendingen	1–0	Grenchen
FC Langnau im Emmental (BE)	2–6	Urania Genève Sport
Monthey	1–2	Vevey Sports
Etoile Carouge	4–2	FC Nidau
Bern	7–0	Chênois
Racing Club Lausanne	3–1	FC Olten
La Chaux-de-Fonds	2–0	FC Porrentruy
USI Dopolavoro Genève	3–2	FC Gerlafingen
Zofingen	0–1	Cantonal Neuchâtel
Servette	9–1	Fribourg
Montreux-Sports	0–5	Lausanne-Sport
Biel-Bienne	2–0	US Bienne-Boujean
FC St-Imier	1–2	Richemond-Daillettes (FR)
FC Sierre	2–3 *	Solothurn
Bellinzona	0–1	Basel
St. Gallen	1–0	Kreuzlingen
US Bottecchia Basel	0–1	Concordia Basel
Zürich	1–3 (a.e.t.)	Wohlen
Brühl	6–1	Kickers Luzern
Young Fellows	2–0	Baden
Luzern	5–3	FC Adliswil
Nordstern	9–1	Arbon
Old Boys	3–5 (a.e.t.)	Blue Stars
Lugano	7–1	SV Seebach
Juventus Zürich	2–3	Grasshopper Club
Frauenfeld	2–3	Locarno
Sparta Schaffhausen	3–0	FC Allschwil
FC Töss (Winterthur)	0–1 (a.e.t.)	Winterthur
Chiasso	3–1	FC Birsfelden
Aarau	5–1	CS La Tour-de-Peilz
Young Boys	12–0	Villeneuve-Sports
28 October 1934
FC Wädenswil	4–2	GC Luganesi

- Note to the match Sierre–Solothurn: The match was played in Solothurn

=== Matches ===
7 October 1934

Servette	9–1	Fribourg
4x Kielholz; 3x Tax; 1x Buchoux; 1x Aeby	Servette summary	Goal

Stade des Charmilles, Geneva
- Sevette played the 1934/35 season in the Nationalliga (top-tier), Fribourg in the 1. Liga (second tier).

7 October 1934

Bellinzona	0–1	Basel
	FCB summary	(0:1) Haftl

Campo Granata, Bellinzona
Attendance: 1,100
Referee: Alfred Spengler (Erlenbach, Switzerland)
- Bellinzona played the 1934/35 season in the 1. Liga (second tier), Basel in the Nationalliga (top-tier).

7 October 1934
10:15

Zürich	1–3 (a.e.t.)	Wohlen
Neeracher 46' (1:1)	FCZ summary	43' (0:1) Seiler; 100' (1:2) Seiler; 115' (1:3) A. Meyer

Letzigrund, Zürich
Attendance: 200
Referee: (Switzerland) Saly Rosenbaum (Zürich)
- Zürich played the 1934/35 season in the 1. Liga (second tier), Wohlen in the 2. Liga (third tier).

7 October 1934

Aarau	5–1	CS La Tour-de-Peilz
Goal	FCA summary	Goal

Stadion Brügglifeld, Aarau
- Aarau played the 1934/35 season in the 1. Liga (second tier), CS La Tour-de-Peilz in the 3. Liga (fourth tier).

== Round 2 ==
=== Summary ===
Team 1	Score	Team 2
18 November 1934
Aarau	1–1 (a.e.t.)	Young Boys
SC Derendingen	1–5	Urania Genève Sport
Vevey Sports	0–2	Etoile Carouge
Bern	4–1	Racing Club Lausanne
La Chaux-de-Fonds	3–1	USI Dopolavoro Genève
Cantonal Neuchâtel	1–2	Servette
Lausanne-Sport	5–2	Biel-Bienne
Richemond-Daillettes (FR)	1–5	Solothurn
Basel	5–2	St. Gallen
Concordia Basel	2–0	Wohlen
Brühl	1–2	Young Fellows
Luzern	1–2	Nordstern
Blue Stars	0–3	Lugano
FC Wädenswil	1–7	Grasshopper Club
Locarno	6–1	Sparta Schaffhausen
Winterthur	1–4	Chiasso

Replay

Team 1	Score	Team 2
1 December 1934
Young Boys	4–0	Aarau

=== Matches ===
18 November 1934

Aarau	1–1 (a.e.t.)	Young Boys
Goal	FCA summary	Goal

Stadion Brügglifeld, Aarau

1 December 1934
Replay

Young Boys	4–0	Aarau
Goal	FCA summary

Wankdorf Stadium, Bern
- Young Boys played the 1934/35 season in the Nationalliga (top-tier).

18 November 1934

Cantonal Neuchâtel	1–2	Servette
Goal	Servette summary	Buchoux; Tax

Stade de la Maladière, Neuchâtel
- Cantonal played the 1934/35 season in the 1. Liga (second tier).

18 November 1935
14:45

Basel	5–2	St. Gallen
Müller 15' (1:0); Jaeck 30' (2:0); Schlecht 33' (3:0); Jaeck 54' (4:0); Müller 84' (pen 5:1)	FCB summary	80' (4:1) Cellere; 87' (pen. 5:2) Meier (I)

Landhof, Basel
Attendance: 3,000
Referee: (Switzerland) Rodolphe Wittwer (Geneva)
- St. Gallen played the 1934/35 season in the 1. Liga (second tier).

== Round 3 ==
=== Summary ===
Team 1	Score	Team 2
2 December 1934
La Chaux-de-Fonds	1–2	Bern
Urania Genève Sport	2–0	Solothurn
Lausanne-Sport	7–1	Etoile Carouge
Young Boys	1–2 (a.e.t.)	Servette
Concordia Basel	1–7	Nordstern
Basel	2–0	Chiasso
Lugano	4–0	Locarno
Young Fellows	1–2	Grasshopper Club

=== Matches ===
2 December 1934

Lausanne-Sport	7–1	Etoile Carouge
Jäggi 10' (1:0); Spagnoli 25' (2:1); Jäggi 40' (pen.); Hochsträsser 60' (4:1); Spagnoli 70' (5:1); Jäggi 80' (6:1); Hochsträsser 85' (7:1)	Summary	15' (o.g.) Stelzer

Pontaise, Lausanne
- Both teams played the 1934/35 season in the Nationalloga (top-tier).

2 December 1934

Young Boys	1–2 (a.e.t.)	Servette
Horrisberger 48' (1:1)	Servette summary	44' (0:1) Laube; 110' (1:2) Tax

Wankdorf Stadium, Bern
- Both teams played the 1934/35 season in the Nationalloga (top-tier).

2 December 1934

Concordia Basel	1–7	Nordstern
1x Krogmeier	Summary	3x Wesely; 3x Büche; 1x Martinolli

Stadion Rankhof, Basel
- Both teams played the 1934/35 season in the Nationalloga (top-tier).

2 December 1934
13:00

Basel	2–0	Chiasso
Jaeck 70' (pen. 1:0); Hufschmid 80' (2:0)	FCB summary

Stadion Schützenmatte, Basel
Attendance: 4,000
Referee: Alfred Spengler (Erlenbach, Switzerland)
- Chiasso played the 1934/35 season in the 1. Liga (second tier).

== Quarter-finals ==
The quarter-finals were due to take place on 2 February 1935, but all the matches were postponed due to bad weather and rescheduled for the beginning of March.

=== Summary ===
Team 1	Score	Team 2
3 March 1935
Lausanne-Sport	8–0	Urania Genève Sport
Bern	2–0	Servette
Grasshopper Club	2–3	Nordstern
Basel	5–3	Lugano

]

=== Matches ===
3 March 1935

Lausanne-Sport	8–0	Urania Genève Sport
Rochat 10' (1:0); Jäggi 25' (pen.); Hochsträsser 53' (3:0); Stelzer 59' (4:0); Stelzer 74' (5:0); Hochsträsser 84' (6:0); Hochsträsser 86' (7:0); Stelzer 88' (8:0)	Summary

Pontaise, Lausanne
- Urania played the 1934/35 season in the 1. Liga (second tier).

3 March 1935

Bern	2–0	Servette
Gerhold 46' (1:0); Townley 71' (2:0)	Servette summary

Stadion Neufeld, Bern
- Both teams played the 1934/35 season in the Nationalloga (top-tier).

3 March 1935

Grasshopper Club	2–3	Nordstern
Springer 30' (1:2); Max Abegglen 75' (2:3)	Summary	2' (0:1) Possak; 20' (0:2) Büche; 66' (1:3) Martinolli

Hardturm, Zürich
- Both teams played the 1934/35 season in the Nationalloga (top-tier).

3 March 1935
14:30

Basel	5–3	Lugano
Müller 9' (1:0); Schlecht 35' (2:2); Hummel (3:2); Haftl 55' (4:2); Müller (5:3)	FCB summary	29' (1:1) Amadò; 32' (1:2) Zali; 62' (4:3) Poretti

Landhof, Basel
Attendance: 5,000
Referee: (Switzerland) Hans Enderli (Winterthur)
- Both teams played the 1934/35 season in the Nationalloga (top-tier).

== Semi-finals ==
=== Summary ===
Team 1	Score	Team 2
22 April 1935
Bern	1–2	Lausanne-Sport
Nordstern	3–2	Basel

=== Matches ===
22 April 1935

Bern	1–2	Lausanne-Sport
Gerhold 60' (1:2)	Summary	23' (0:1) Stelzer; 36' (0:2) Spagnoli

Stadion Neufeld, Bern
Referee: (Switzerland) Karl Wunderlin (Basel)

22 April 1935
15:00

Nordstern Basel	3–2	Basel
Mohler 10' (1:0); Büche 27' (pen. 2:0); Büche 33' (3:0)	FCB summary	40' (3:0) Jaeck; 60' (pen. 3:2) Jaeck

Stadion Rankhof, Basel
Attendance: 10,000
Referee: (Switzerland) Hans Enderli (Winterthur)

== Final ==
The final was held in Lausanne, at the Pontaise, on Sunday 19 May 1935.

=== Summary ===
Team 1	Score	Team 2
19 May 1935
Lausanne-Sport	10–0	Nordstern Basel

=== Telegram ===
19 May 1935

Lausanne-Sport	10–0	Nordstern Basel
Jäggi 27' (1:0); Grosz 55' (2:0); Spagnoli 58' (3:0); Rochat 60' (4:0); Jäggi 61' (5:0); Spagnoli 62' (6:0); Spagnoli 65' (7:0); Jäggi 72' (8:0); Jäggi 73' (9:0); Jäggi 83' (10:0)	Fussball-Schweiz summary

Pontaise, Lausanne
Attendance: 10,000
Referee: (Switzerland) Rudolphe Wittwer (Geneva)

Lausanne-Sport won the cup and this was the club's first cup title to this date. As they won the Swiss championship two weeks later, on 19 May, the team won the domestic Double in this season. This was the clubs first double to this date. This is the highest Swiss Cup final result of all time (together with GC–Lausanne in 1937). Willy Jäggi is the only player to date to score five goals in a cup final.

== Further in Swiss football ==
- 1934–35 Nationalliga
- 1934–35 Swiss 1. Liga

== Sources ==
- Fussball-Schweiz
- FCB Cup games 1934–35 at fcb-achiv.ch
- Switzerland 1934–35 at RSSSF

Preceded by 1933–34	Swiss Cup seasons	Succeeded by 1935–36
