= Ignace Tax =

Austrian footballer (1909–1977)

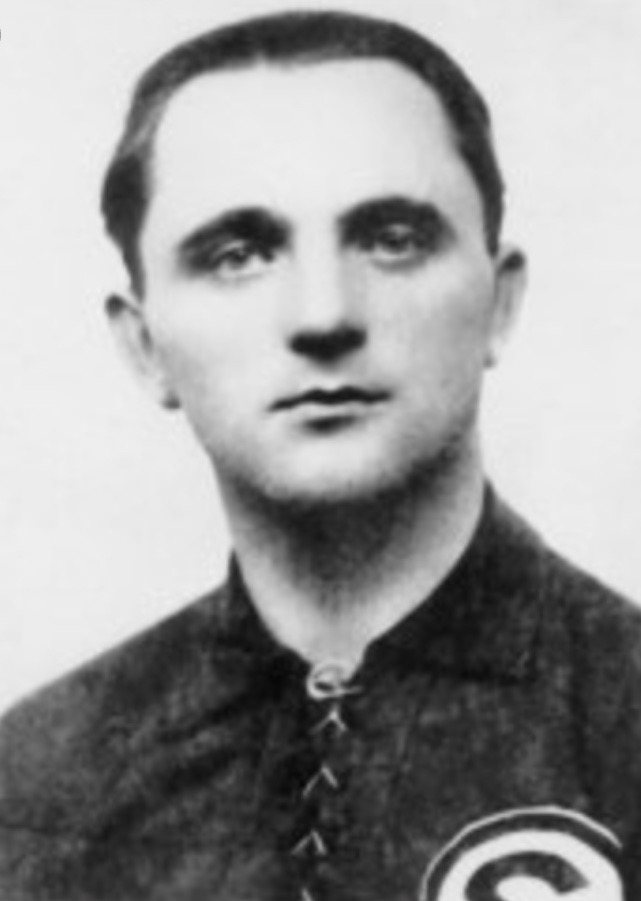
- Ignace Tax at Saint-Étienne

Personal information
- Full name: Johann Ignace Tax
- Date of birth: 9 April 1909
- Place of birth: Vienna, Austria-Hungary
- Date of death: 7 January 1977 (aged 67)
- Place of death: Perpignan, France
- Position: Midfielder

Senior career*
Years	Team	Apps	(Gls)
1927–1930	Wacker Vienna	54	(18)
1931	First Vienna		
1931–1935	Servette		
1935–1945	Saint-Étienne	133	(54)

Managerial career
- 1943–1950: Saint-Étienne
- 1954–1955: JGA Nevers
- * Club domestic league appearances and goals

Johann Ignace Tax (9 April 1909 – 7 January 1977), also spelt as Ignaz Tax, was an Austrian-French footballer who played as a midfielder.

== Career ==
Tax joined Wacker Vienna in 1927, and spent three and a half seasons there, before joining First Vienna halfway through the 1930–31 season. In the summer of 1931, he joined former teammate Karl Rappan at Servette, where Rappan was the player-manager. He helped Servette win two Swiss Nationalliga titles, and finish runners-up in the 1933–34 Swiss Cup.

On 4 July 1935, Tax joined Saint-Étienne for a transfer fee 50,000 francs. While there, he formed a duo with former Yugoslav international Ivan Bek. Following the German invasion of France during World War II, he was captured by the Germans, and interned in Belgium until the end of 1941. Afterwards, he returned to playing for Saint-Étienne.

In 1943, Tax was appointed as the manager of Saint-Étienne. Around the same time, Saint-Étienne president Pierre Guichard registered four players, including Tax, as employees of his company to circumvent Vichy France's ban on both professionalism and foreign players. Because of this, they were banned by the French Football Federation, but were pardoned following the liberation of France. In July 1950, after Guichard return to the club as president following the ban, Tax was dismissed and replaced by former teammate Jean Snella.

== Legacy ==
One of the streets near the Stade Geoffroy-Guichard is named after him.

== Honours ==
First Vienna

- Austrian football championship: 1930–31

Servette

- Nationalliga: 1932–33, 1933–34
- Swiss Cup runner-up: 1933–34
