= Mariétan =

Mariétan is a surname that occurs in Switzerland. Notable people with the surname include:

- Claude Mariétan (born 1953), Swiss footballer and coach
- Pierre Mariétan (1935–2025), Swiss composer
