= 1921–22 Swiss Serie A =

Swiss football season

Swiss Serie A
- Season: 1921–22

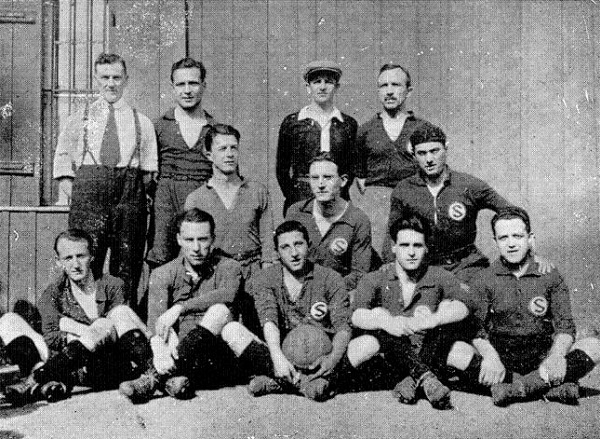
Servette 1922

Statistics of Swiss Super League in the 1921–22 season.

== East ==
=== Table ===
Pos	Team	Pld	W	D	L	GF	GA	GD	Pts
1	Blue Stars Zürich	14	10	1	3	27	11	+16	21
2	Grasshopper Club Zürich	14	9	2	3	37	20	+17	20
3	FC Zürich	14	6	2	6	26	23	+3	14
4	FC St. Gallen	14	5	4	5	26	24	+2	14
5	Young Fellows Zürich	14	4	4	6	19	25	−6	12
6	Brühl St. Gallen	14	5	1	8	19	34	−15	11
7	FC Winterthur	14	3	4	7	16	25	−9	10
8	Neumünster Zürich	14	3	4	7	15	23	−8	10

Source: rsssf.com

=== Results ===
Home \ Away	BSZ	BRU	GCZ	NEU	STG	WIN	YFZ	ZÜR
Blue Stars Zürich		2–0	4–0	1–0	4–0	1–0	1–1	5–2
Brühl	2–0		1–4	3–1	0–3	0–1	3–2	2–1
Grasshopper	0–1	7–0		3–1	3–2	3–2	5–0	3–2
Neumünster	2–0	0–3	1–1		2–3	2–3	1–1	0–2
St. Gallen	2–0	3–3	1–2	0–0		5–0	1–2	2–2
Winterthur	1–3	2–0	2–2	1–2	1–1		0–0	2–2
Young Fellows	1–2	4–2	3–1	2–2	1–3	1–0		0–1
Zürich	0–3	4–0	0–3	0–1	4–0	3–1	3–1	

Legend: Blue = home team win; Yellow = draw; Red = away team win.

== Central ==
=== Table ===
Pos	Team	Pld	W	D	L	GF	GA	GD	Pts
1	FC Lucerne	14	8	4	2	26	19	+7	20
2	FC Biel	14	6	4	4	24	23	+1	16
3	FC Basel	14	6	3	5	20	21	−1	15
4	Young Boys Bern	14	5	4	5	25	17	+8	14
5	Nordstern Basel	14	6	2	6	18	22	−4	14
6	FC Bern	14	5	2	7	22	21	+1	12
7	FC Aarau	14	3	6	5	14	17	−3	12
8	Old Boys Basel	14	2	5	7	14	23	−9	9

Source: rsssf.com

=== Results ===
Home \ Away	AAR	BAS	BER	BIE	LUZ	NOR	OBB	YB
Aarau		2–1	1–0	2–2	1–1	1–1	0–0	0–3
Basel	2–1		4–3	1–0	3–1	1–0	0–2	1–3
Bern	1–0	0–1		2–3	2–2	4–0	1–0	3–2
Biel	0–3	1–1	2–1		1–2	3–2	4–0	0–0
Luzern	1–0	2–2	3–2	3–0		1–0	2–1	3–2
Nordstern	3–1	3–2	2–0	2–3	1–0		2–1	1–0
Old Boys	1–1	2–0	1–3	2–2	3–3	0–0		1–2
Young Boys	1–1	1–1	0–0	2–3	1–2	5–1	3–0	

Legend: Blue = home team win; Yellow = draw; Red = away team win.

== West ==
=== Table ===
Pos	Team	Pld	W	D	L	GF	GA	GD	Pts
1	Servette Genf	14	8	6	0	28	10	+18	22
2	FC La Chaux-de-Fonds	14	8	1	5	29	22	+7	17
3	Lausanne Sports	14	7	2	5	24	16	+8	16
4	Montreux Sports	14	6	2	6	23	28	−5	14
5	Cantonal Neuchatel	14	5	3	6	36	26	+10	13
6	Etoile La Chaux-de-Fonds	14	5	3	6	23	20	+3	13
7	FC Genf	14	1	7	6	19	37	−18	9
8	FC Fribourg	14	3	2	9	13	36	−23	8

Source: rsssf.com

=== Results ===
Home \ Away	CAN	CDF	ÉTS	FRI	GEN	LS	MON	SER
Cantonal Neuchâtel		3–0	2–1	1–1	10–1	1–3	2–3	1–1
Chaux-de-Fonds	3–2		3–0	3–0	2–2	2–1	3–0	0–1
Étoile-Sporting	4–1	1–2		5–1	0–0	1–0	4–1	1–1
Fribourg	2–1	1–7	3–1		2–2	0–2	0–3	0–2
Genève	3–6	0–3	1–3	4–0		1–1	1–3	1–4
Lausanne-Sports	2–1	4–1	3–0	1–0	1–1		3–0	1–2
Montreux-Sports	1–4	3–0	2–0	1–2	1–1	3–2		1–1
Servette	1–1	3–0	2–2	3–1	1–1	3–0	3–0	

Legend: Blue = home team win; Yellow = draw; Red = away team win.

== Final ==
=== Table ===
Pos	Team	Pld	W	D	L	GF	GA	GD	Pts
1	Servette Genf	2	2	0	0	3	0	+3	4
2	FC Lucerne	2	1	0	1	2	3	−1	2
3	Blue Stars Zürich	2	0	0	2	1	3	−2	0

Source: rsssf.com

=== Results ===
Team 1	Score	Team 2
28 May 1922
Servette	1–0	Blue Stars Zürich
18 June 1922
Luzern	2–1	Blue Stars Zürich
25 June 1922
Servette	2–0	Luzern

Servette Genf won the championship.

== Sources ==
- Switzerland 1921-22 at RSSSF
