= 1933–34 Swiss 1. Liga =

1. Liga
- Season: 1933–34
- Champions: 1. Liga champions: Kreuzlingen; Group West winners: Etoile Carouge; Group East winners: Kreuzlingen
- Promoted: Etoile Carouge
- Relegated: Étoile-Sporting; US Bienne-Boujean; Winterthur
- Matches: twice 72 and 2 deciders plus 1 play-off and 2 play-outs total: 149 matches

The 1933–34 1. Liga season was the third season of the 1. Liga since its creation in 1931. At this time, the 1. Liga was the second-tier of the Swiss football league system.

== Overview ==
There were further changes in the league system in advance of this season. The 1933–34 Nationalliga was reformed and was played for the first time as just one group, with 16 clubs, and no longer in two regional groups with eight teams each. The second tier league remained as before. There were 18 clubs that competed in the 1. Liga this season, but next season would see an increase of a further four clubs.

== Format ==
The 18 clubs were divided into two regional groups, each with 9 teams. The teams in each group played a double round-robin to decide their league position. Two points were awarded for a win and one point was awarded for a draw. Both group winners were promoted to the top-tier Nationalliga, but they contested a two legged play-off round to decide the title of 1. Liga champions. There was to be three relegations. The last placed team in each group were directly relegated to the 2. Liga (third tier) and the two second last placed teams would compete a play-out against the third relegation.

== Group West ==
=== Teams, locations ===
| Club | Based in | Canton | Stadium | Capacity |
|---|---|---|---|---|
| US Bienne-Boujean | Biel/Bienne | Bern | | |
| FC Cantonal Neuchâtel | Neuchâtel | Neuchâtel | Stade de la Maladière | 25,500 |
| Étoile Carouge FC | Carouge | Geneva | Stade de la Fontenette | 3,690 |
| FC Étoile-Sporting | La Chaux-de-Fonds | Neuchâtel | Les Foulets / Terrain des Eplatures | 1,000 / 500 |
| FC Fribourg | Fribourg | Fribourg | Stade Universitaire | 9,000 |
| FC Grenchen | Grenchen | Solothurn | Stadium Brühl | 15,100 |
| FC Monthey | Monthey | Valais | Stade Philippe Pottier | 1,800 |
| Racing Club Lausanne | Lausanne | Vaud | Centre sportif de la Tuilière | 1,000 |
| FC Solothurn | Solothurn | Solothurn | Stadion FC Solothurn | 6,750 |

=== Final league table ===
| Pos | Team | Pld | W | D | L | GF | GA | GD | Pts | Qualification or relegation |
|---|---|---|---|---|---|---|---|---|---|---|
| 1 | Etoile Carouge FC | 16 | 10 | 2 | 4 | 37 | 24 | +13 | 22 | Promotion to 1934–35 Nationalliga, play-off for title |
| 2 | Racing Club Lausanne | 16 | 9 | 1 | 6 | 35 | 25 | +10 | 19 | |
| 3 | FC Solothurn | 16 | 8 | 3 | 5 | 38 | 33 | +5 | 19 | |
| 4 | FC Monthey | 16 | 7 | 3 | 6 | 25 | 28 | −3 | 17 | |
| 5 | FC Cantonal Neuchâtel | 16 | 6 | 4 | 6 | 37 | 29 | +8 | 16 | |
| 6 | FC Fribourg | 16 | 6 | 4 | 6 | 30 | 38 | −8 | 16 | |
| 7 | FC Grenchen | 16 | 6 | 2 | 8 | 24 | 27 | −3 | 14 | |
| 8 | US Bienne-Boujean | 16 | 4 | 5 | 7 | 24 | 31 | −7 | 13 | To play-out against relegation |
| 9 | FC Étoile-Sporting | 16 | 2 | 4 | 10 | 26 | 41 | −15 | 8 | Relegation to 2. Liga |

Source: RSSSF
Rules for classification: 1) Points; 2) Goal difference within the league, but decider play-off for qualifiers.

== Group East ==
=== Teams, locations ===
| Club | Based in | Canton | Stadium | Capacity |
|---|---|---|---|---|
| FC Aarau | Aarau | Aargau | Stadion Brügglifeld | 9,240 |
| AC Bellinzona | Bellinzona | Ticino | Stadio Comunale Bellinzona | 5,000 |
| SC Brühl | St. Gallen | St. Gallen | Paul-Grüninger-Stadion | 4,200 |
| SC Juventus Zürich | Zürich | Zürich | Utogrund | 2,850 |
| FC Kreuzlingen | Kreuzlingen | Thurgau | Sportplatz Hafenareal | 1,200 |
| Luzern | Lucerne | Lucerne | Stadion Allmend | 25,000 |
| FC Seebach Zürich | Zürich | Zürich | Eichrain | 1,000 |
| FC St. Gallen | St. Gallen | St. Gallen | Espenmoos | 11,000 |
| FC Winterthur | Winterthur | Zürich | Schützenwiese | 8,550 |

=== Final league table ===
| Pos | Team | Pld | W | D | L | GF | GA | GD | Pts | Qualification or relegation |
|---|---|---|---|---|---|---|---|---|---|---|
| 1 | FC Kreuzlingen | 16 | 8 | 4 | 4 | 40 | 25 | +15 | 20 | To decider for first place |
| 2 | AC Bellinzona | 16 | 9 | 2 | 5 | 36 | 29 | +7 | 20 | To decider for first place |
| 3 | FC Aarau | 16 | 7 | 5 | 4 | 29 | 24 | +5 | 19 | |
| 4 | FC St. Gallen | 16 | 7 | 5 | 4 | 28 | 28 | 0 | 19 | |
| 5 | SC Brühl | 16 | 8 | 2 | 6 | 47 | 38 | +9 | 18 | |
| 6 | Luzern | 16 | 7 | 2 | 7 | 33 | 23 | +10 | 16 | |
| 7 | FC Seebach Zürich | 16 | 3 | 7 | 6 | 23 | 40 | −17 | 13 | To decider for seventh place |
| 8 | SC Juventus Zürich | 16 | 4 | 5 | 7 | 35 | 45 | −10 | 13 | To decider for seventh place |
| 9 | FC Winterthur | 16 | 3 | 0 | 13 | 24 | 43 | −19 | 6 | Relegation to 2. Liga |

Source: RSSSF
Rules for classification: 1) Points; 2) Goal difference within the league, but decider play-off for qualifiers.

=== Decider for first place ===
Kreuzlingen and Bellinzona finished the season level on points in joint first place. As the group winners would qualify for promotion a decider was required. This match was played on 10 June in Stadion Allmend in Lucerne.

| Team 1 | Score | Team 2 |
|---|---|---|
| Kreuzlingen | 1–0 | Bellinzona |

Kreuzlingen won, became group winners, achieved promotion and continued to the play-off for the 1. Liga championship title. Bellinzona remained in the division for the following season.

=== Decider for seventh/eighth place ===
Seebach and Juventus finished the season level on points in joint seventh/eighth place. As seventh position remained in the division and eighth position meant competing a play-out against relegation, a decider was required. This match was fixtured for 3 June.

| Team 1 | Score | Team 2 |
|---|---|---|
| Juventus | ppd. | Seebach |

However, the match was postponed and replayed at the Seebach ground on 17 June 1934.

| Team 1 | Score | Team 2 |
|---|---|---|
| Seebach | 1–4 | Juventus |

Juventus won and remained in the division for the following season. Seebach continued in the play-out against relegation.

== Promotion, relegation ==
=== Championship play-off ===
The two group winners had achieved promotion to the 1934–35 Nationalliga. They now played a one legged tie in a neutral stadium for the title of 1. Liga champions. This play-off took place on 17 June 1934 at Stade de la Maladière in Neuchâtel.

| Team 1 | Score | Team 2 |
|---|---|---|
| Kreuzlingen | 3–0 | Etoile Carouge |

Kreuzlingen won the 1. Liga championship title. However, they later declined the promotion due to financial reasons.

=== Play-out against relegation ===
Both teams in eighth position in their groups contested a play-out against relegation. These games took place on 24 June and 1 July

| Team 1 | Score | Team 2 |
|---|---|---|
| Bienne-Boujean | 0–2 | Seebach |
| Seebach | 2–1 | Bienne-Boujean |

Seebach won and remained in the division for the following season. Bienne-Boujean were relegated to the 2. Liga.

== Further in Swiss football ==
- 1933–34 Nationalliga
- 1933–34 Swiss Cup

== Sources ==
- Switzerland 1933–34 at RSSSF

| Preceded by 1932–33 | Seasons in Swiss 1. Liga | Succeeded by 1934–35 |
