= 1933–34 Swiss Cup =

Tournament details
- Country: Switzerland

Final positions
- Champions: Grasshopper Club
- Runners-up: Servette

The 1933–34 Swiss Cup was the 9th edition of Switzerland's football cup competition, organised annually since the 1925–26 season by the Swiss Football Association.

== Overview ==
This season's cup competition began with two preliminary rounds, before the main competition began. These two rounds were played during the last two week-ends of August 1933. The first principal round was played at the beginning of October. The competition was to be completed on Easter Monday 2 April 1934, with the final, which this year was held at the Wankdorf Stadium in Bern.

The preliminary rounds were held for the lower league teams that were not qualified for the main rounds. Reserve teams were not admitted to the competition. The 16 clubs from the 1933–34 Nationalliga and the 18 clubs from this season's 1. Liga joined the competition in the first principal round, which was played on Sunday 1 October.

The matches were played in a knockout format. In the preliminary rounds, in the event of a draw after 90 minutes, the match went into extra time. In the event of a draw at the end of extra time, if agreed between the clubs, a second extra time was played. If the score was still level at the final whistle, a toss of a coin would establish the team that qualified for the next round. Replays were not foreseen until the main competition and these ware played on the visiting team's pitch. If the replay ended in a draw after extra time, or if a replay had not been agreed, again a toss of a coin would establish the team that qualified for the next round.

== Preliminary rounds ==
The lower league teams that had not qualified for the competition competed here in two preliminary knockout rounds. Reserve teams were not admitted to the competition. The aim of this preliminary stage was to reduce the number of lower league teams to 30 before the first main round, to join the 34 clubs from the top two tiers. The draw in the preliminary stage and in the early rounds of the main competition respected local regionalities. Both preliminary rounds were played during August in advance of the lower leagues regional season.

=== First preliminary round ===
Team 1	Score	Team 2
20 August 1933
FC Stade Payerne	11–1	FC Le Sentier
Montreux-Sports	7–1	CS La Tour-de-Peilz
Stade Lausanne	2–1	Martigny-Sports
Vevey Sports	2–1	Villeneuve-Sports
FC Chailly	0–4	Sion
FC Sierre	7–3	CA Genève
Stade Nyonnais	8–1	Olimpia Vevey
FC Boudry	1–3	FC Morat
FC Le Parc (La Chaux-de-Fonds)	1–0	Sylva-Sports (Le Locle)
FC Gloria (Le Locle)	3–2	FC Le Locle
Concordia Yverdon	6–3	Comète Peseux
FC Xamax (Neuchâtel)	1–4 *	FC Fleurier
FC Birsfelden	0–2	FC Tavannes
FC Münchenstein	5–1	FC Sissach
FC Porrentruy (t)	2–2 (a.e.t.) *	Dornach
FC Reconvilier	4–1	FC Liestal
Delémont	3–0	FC Breite (Basel)
Laufen	0–0 (a.e.t.) *	Black Stars (t)
Moutier	3–1	Sportfreunde Basel
FC Tramelan	1–7	Old Boys
FC Allschwil	4–2	SC Kleinhüningen
Sport Boys Bern	3–2	FC Langenthal
FC Länggasse (Bern)	4–7	Thun
FC Nidau	2–0	FC Biberist
FC Madretsch (Biel)	0–3	FC Olten
Burgdorf	1–2	SCI Esperia (Bern)
Zähringia Bern	4–0	Minerva Bern
FC Helvetia Bern	5–0	FC Lerchenfeld (Thun)
FC Horgen	3–1	FC Kölliken
FC Altstetten (Zürich)	4–2	FC Langnau am Albis (ZH)
FC Wädenswil	2–0	Uster
Wohlen	3–0	FC Dietikon
Red Star	2–8	Kickers Luzern
FC Wiedikon	2–0	SV Höngg
FC Buchs (AG)	2–1	FC Thalwil
FC Lenzburg	1–2	Sportclub Luzern
FC Diana (Zürich)	5–1	FC Brugg
FC Oerlikon (ZH)	1–0	Zofingen
FC Hakoah Zürich	3–0	FC Küsnacht (ZH)
FC Industrie (ZH)	1–2	FC Adliswil
FC Rapperswil	2–8	Baden
SC Veltheim (Winterthur)	1–2	Sparta Schaffhausen
FC Bülach	6–0	FC Phönix (Winterthur)
FC Tössfeld (Winterthur)	2–1	Frauenfeld
FC Neuhausen	0–3	FC Töss (Winterthur)
Arbon	4–2	Herisau
FC Rohrschach	5–4	FC St. Margarethen
FC Buchs (SG)	3–1	FC Romanshorn
FC Weinfelden	1–6	FC Fortuna (SG)
Chiasso	1–2	Mendrisio
GC Luganesi	2–5	SC Balerna

- The match Xamax–Fleurier was played in Colombier.
- Note (t): The match Porrentruy–Dornach ended in a draw. Porrentruy qualified on toss of a coin.
- Note (t): The match Laufen–Black Stars ended in a draw. Black Stars qualified on toss of a coin.

=== Second preliminary round ===
Team 1	Score	Team 2
27 August 1933
FC Stade Payerne	5–2	FC Morat
Vevey Sports	4–1	FC Le Parc (La Chaux-de-Fonds)
Stade Lausanne	2–3	Sion
Stade Nyonnais	2–4	Concordia Yverdon
FC Gloria (Le Locle)	5–2 (a.e.t.)	FC Jonction (GE)
Montreux-Sports	6–1	FC Sierre
FC Fleurier	3–1	Central Fribourg
Mendrisio	1–4	SC Balerna
FC Reconvilier	1–5	Old Boys
FC Allschwil	2–0	Delémont
FC Helvetik (Basel)	6–3	FC Tavannes
FC Münchenstein	1–0	Moutier
FC Porrentruy	3–4	Black Stars
FC Nidau	1–3	FC Viktoria Bern
SC Derendingen	3–2	Fulgor Grenchen
FC Olten	2–0	SCI Esperia (Bern)
Sport Boys Bern	2–1	FC Helvetia Bern
Thun	5–0	Zähringia Bern
Baden	0–1	FC Wädenswil
FC Adliswil	3–1	Wohlen
FC Hakoah Zürich	1–2	Kickers Luzern
FC Buchs (AG)	1–0	FC Altstetten (Zürich)
FC Wiedikon	2–6	Luzern
FC Oerlikon (ZH)	12–0	FC Gränichen
FC Fortuna (SG)	3–3 (a.e.t.) *	FC Töss (Winterthur) (t)
FC Tössfeld (Winterthur)	4–6	FC Rohrschach
Arbon	1–2	FC Bülach
FC Buchs (SG)	4–2	Sparta Schaffhausen

- Note (t): The match Fortuna–Töss ended with a draw. FC Töss qualified on toss of a coin.

== First principal round ==
=== Summary ===
Team 1	Score	Team 2
1 October 1933
Lugano	6–0	FC Töss (Winterthur)
Grasshopper Club	8–0	FC Oerlikon (ZH)
Zürich	0–1 (a.e.t.)	Bellinzona
Luzern	7–2	FC Adliswil
Blue Stars	4–2	SC Balerna
SV Seebach	8–0	FC Helvetik (Basel)
Young Fellows	3–1	St. Gallen
Aarau	7–1	Bülach
Urania Genève Sport	5–2	Sion
Servette	7–1	Thun
FC Fleurier	3–2	Concordia Basel
FC Olten	4–1	Racing-Club Lausanne
Etoile Carouge	1–0	Concordia Yverdon
FC Gloria (Le Locle)	0–7	Bern
FC Payerne	1–10	Biel-Bienne
SC Derendingen	3–4	Cantonal Neuchâtel
Lausanne-Sport	5–1	Étoile-Sporting
Basel	8–0	Solothurn
Young Boys	1–2	Nordstern
Vevey Sports	1–2	Fribourg
Locarno	7–1	FC Allschwil
FC Buchs (AG)	5–3	FC Buchs (SG)
Juventus Zürich	1–2	Kickers Luzern
Winterthur	3–2	Black Stars
Montreux-Sports	5–1	USI Dopolavoro Genève
La Chaux-de-Fonds	3–2	Grenchen
Monthey	5–0	Sports Boys Bern
US Bienne-Boujean	0–1	FC Viktoria Bern
Luzerner SC	1–2	Old Boys
Kreuzlingen	1–2	Brühl
FC Rorschach	1–4	FC Wädenswil
Diana Zürich	3–1 (a.e.t.)	FC Münchenstein

=== Matches ===
1 October 1933
15:00

Zürich	0–1 (a.e.t.)	Bellinzona
	FCZ summary	117' (0:1) Berini

Letzigrund, Zürich
Attendance: 1,500
Referee: (Switzerland) Hans Enderli (Winterthur)
- Zürich played the 1933/34 season in the Nationalliga (top-tier), Bellinzona in the 1. Liga (second tier).

1 October 1933

Aarau	7–1	Bülach
Goal	FCA summary	Goal

Stadion Brügglifeld, Aarau
- Aarau played the 1933/34 season in the 1. Liga (second tier), Bülach in the 2. Liga (third tier).

1 October 1933

Servette	7–1	Thun
1x Amadò; 3x Passello; 2x Tax; 1x Laube	Servette summary	Goal

Stade des Charmilles, Geneva
Referee: Amadò, 3x Passello, 2x Tax, Laube
- Servette played the 1933/34 season in the Nationalliga (top-tier), Thun in the 2. Liga (third tier).

1 October 1933
15:00

Basel	8–0	Solothurn
Haftl (1:0); Jaeck (2:0); Schlecht (3:0); Müller 35' (4:0); Haftl (5:0); Jaeck (pen. 6:0); Hufschmid 75' (7:0); Hufschmid (8:0)	FCB summary

Landhof, Basel
Attendance: 2,500
Referee: (Switzerland) William Bangerter (La Chaux-de-Fonds)
- Basel played the 1933/34 season in the Nationalliga (top-tier), Solothurn in the 1. Liga (second tier).

== Round 2 ==
=== Summary ===
Team 1	Score	Team 2
5 November 1933
Lugano	0–1	Grasshopper Club
Bellinzona	2–3	Luzern
Blue Stars	6–5	SV Seebach
Young Fellows	4–3	Aarau
Urania Genève Sport	0–3	Servette
FC Fleurier	1–2	FC Olten
Bern	2–0	Etoile Carouge
Biel-Bienne	8–3	Cantonal Neuchâtel
Lausanne-Sport	1–3	Basel
Nordstern	5–0	Fribourg
Locarno	6–0	FC Buchs (AG)
Kickers Luzern	1–4	Winterthur
Montreux-Sports	2–1	La Chaux-de-Fonds
Monthey	1–0	FC Viktoria Bern
Old Boys	0–1	Brühl
FC Wädenswil	5–1	FC Diana Zürich

=== Matches ===
5 November 1933

Young Fellows	4–3	Aarau
Goal	FCA summary	Goal

Förrlibuck, Zürich
- Young Fellows played the 1933/34 season in the Nationalliga (top-tier), Aarau in the 1. Liga (second tier).

5 November 1933

Urania Genève Sport	0–3	Servette
	Servette summary	(0:1) Passello (0:2) Kielholz (0:3) Tax

Stade de Frontenex, Genève
- Both teams played the 1933/34 season in the Nationalliga (top-tier).

5 November 1933
14:30

Lausanne-Sport	1–3	Basel
Spagnoli 70' (1:2)	Summary	60' (0:1) Haftl; 65' (0:2) Wesely; 80' (1:3) Müller

Stade de la Pontaise, Lausanne
Attendance: 3,000
Referee: Alfred Spengler (Erlenbach, Switzerland)
- Both teams played the 1933/34 season in the Nationalliga (top-tier).

== Round 3 ==
=== Summary ===
Team 1	Score	Team 2
3 December 1933
Brühl	8–1	FC Wädenswil
10 December 1933
Luzern	1–4	Grasshopper Club
Young Fellows	4–0	Blue Stars
Servette	8–1	FC Olten
Bern	1–3	Biel-Bienne
Basel	3–1	Nordstern
Locarno	3–0	Winterthur
Montreux-Sports	4–0	Monthey

=== Matches ===
10 December 1933

Luzern	1–4	Grasshopper Club
Brönnimann	RSSSF summary	2x A. Abegglen; 2x Schott

Stadion Allmend, Lucerne
- Luzern played the 1933/34 season in the 1. Liga (second tier), Grasshopper Club in the Nationalliga (top-tier).

10 December 1933

Servette	8–1	FC Olten
1x Laube; 2x Kielholz; 4x Tax; 1x Guinchard	Servette summary	35' Sauer

Stade des Charmilles, Geneva
- Servette played the 1933/34 season in the Nationalliga (top-tier), Olten in the 2. Liga (third tier).

10 December 1933
14:30

Basel	3–1	Nordstern Basel
Haftl 42' (1:1); Haftl (2:1); Haftl 78' (3:1)	FCB summary	26' (0:1) Clunas

Landhof, Basel
Attendance: 6,000
Referee: (Switzerland) Rodolphe Wittwer (Geneva)
- Both teams played the 1933/34 season in the Nationalliga (top-tier).

10 December 1933

Montreux-Sports	4–0	Monthey
Bernard 70' (1:0); Bernard 72' (pen.); Tschirren 82' (3:0); Bernard 85' (4:0)	RSSSF summary

Stade de Chailly, Montreux
- Montreux-Sports played the 1933/34 season in the 2. Liga (third tier), Monthey in the 1. Liga (second tier).

== Quarter-finals ==
=== Summary ===
Team 1	Score	Team 2
4 February 1934
Grasshopper Club	6–1	Young Fellows
Servette	4–0	Biel-Bienne
Basel	3–4 (a.e.t.)	Locarno
Montreux-Sports	4–2	Brühl

=== Matches ===
4 February 1934

Grasshopper Club	6–1	Young Fellows
2x Fauguel; 1x W. Weiler; 1x Max Abegglen; 2x A. Abegglen	RSSSF summary	Frigerio

Hardturm, Zürich
- Both teams played the 1933/34 season in the Nationalliga (top-tier).

4 February 1934

Servette	4–0	Biel-Bienne
Kielholz 42' (1:0); Laube 44' (2:0); Laube 71' (3:0); Tax 72' (4:0)	Servette summary

Stade des Charmilles, Geneva
- Both teams played the 1933/34 season in the Nationalliga (top-tier).

4 February 1934
14:30

Basel	3–4 (a.e.t.)	Locarno
Jaeck 40' (1:2); Haftl 50' (2:2); Haftl 57' (3:2)	Summary	26' (0:1) Pomi; 32' (0:2) Pinter; 80' (3:3) Cavalli; 107' (3:4) Pinter

Landhof, Basel
Attendance: 3,500
Referee: (Switzerland) Rodolphe Wittwer (Geneva)
- Both teams played the 1933/34 season in the Nationalliga (top-tier).

4 February 1934

Montreux-Sports	4–2	Brühl
Sandoz 18' (1:0); Tschirren 82' (2:1); Sandoz 84' (3:1); Sandoz 87' (4:2)	RSSSF summary	40' (1:1) Chabanel; 85' (3:2) Clerico

Stade de Chailly, Montreux
- Montreux-Sports played the 1933/34 season in the 2. Liga (third tier), Brühl in the 1. Liga (second tier).

== Semi-finals ==
=== Summary ===
Team 1	Score	Team 2
4 March 1934
Servette	5–1	Montreux-Sports
Grasshopper Club	5–2	Locarno

=== Matches ===
4 March 1934

Servette	5–1	Montreux-Sports
Aeby 15' (1:0); Aeby 35' (2:1); Tax 40' (3:1); Tax 57' (4:0); Aeby 83' (5:1)	RSSSF summary	31' (1:1) Lehner

Pontaise, Lausanne
Attendance: 6,000
Referee: (Switzerland) Karl Wunderlin (Basel)
- Servette played the 1933/34 season in the Nationalliga (top-tier), Montreux-Sports in the 2. Liga (third tier).

4 March 1934

Grasshopper Club	5–2	Locarno
Fauguel 5' (1:0); Sobotka 12' (2:0); Weiler I 21' (3:0); Weiler I 53' (4:2); Max Abegglen 88' (5:2)	RSSSF summary	38' (3:1) Stalder; 48' (3:2) Cavalli

Hardturm, Zürich
Attendance: 4,000
Referee: Alfred Spengler (Erlenbach, Switzerland)
- Both teams played the 1933/34 season in the Nationalliga (top-tier).

== Final ==
The final was held in the capital in Bern, at the Wankdorf Stadium, on Easter Monday 1934.

=== Summary ===
Team 1	Score	Team 2
2 April 1934
Grasshopper Club	2–0	Servette

=== Telegram ===
2 April 1934

Grasshopper Club	2–0	Servette
Schott 43' (1:0) (Marad) 55' (o.g.)	Fussball-Schweiz summary

Wankdorf Stadium, Bern
Attendance: 20,000
Referee: (Switzerland) Hans Wüthrich, (Bern)

Grasshopper Club won the cup and this was the club's fourth cup title to this date.

== Further in Swiss football ==
- 1933–34 Nationalliga
- 1933–34 Swiss 1. Liga

== Sources ==
- Fussball-Schweiz
- FCB Cup games 1933–34 at fcb-achiv.ch
- Switzerland 1933–34 at RSSSF

Preceded by 1932–33	Swiss Cup seasons	Succeeded by 1934–35
