= 1933–34 Nationalliga =

Swiss football season

Nationalliga
- Season: 1933–34
- Dates: 27 August 1933 to 24 June 1934
- Champions: Servette
- Relegated: Urania Genève Sport; Blue Stars; Zürich
- Matches: 240
- Top goalscorer: Leopold Kielholz (Servette); 40 goals

The following is the summary of the Swiss National League in the 1933–34 football season. This was the 37th season of top-tier football in Switzerland.

== Overview ==
The Swiss Football Association (ASF/SFV) had 16 member clubs in the top-tier and 18 clubs in the second-tier. The ASF/SFV had modified the format in the top-tier. Up until here the clubs had been divided into two regional groups and then conclusively with a championship play-off. This was the first season that the Nationalliga was played in one national group and with now 240 games nearly twice as many as in the previous season (124).

The 16 teams played a double round-robin to decide their league table positions. Two points were awarded for a win and one point was awarded for a draw. The first placed team at the end of the season would be awarded the Swiss championship title and the last three placed teams were to be relegated to the 1934–35 1. Liga. One team from the second-tier 1. Liga would achieve promotion this season, this woulf reduce the number of teams to 14 next season.

== Nationalliga ==
The league season began with the first matchday on 27 August 1933 and was concluded with the last round on 23 and 24 June 1934.

=== Teams, locations ===
Team	Based in	Canton	Stadium	Capacity
FC Basel	Basel	Basel-Stadt	Landhof	4,000
FC Bern	Bern	Bern	Stadion Neufeld	14,000
FC Biel-Bienne	Biel/Bienne	Bern	Stadion Gurzelen	5,500
FC Blue Stars Zürich	Zürich	Zürich	Hardhof	1,000
FC Concordia Basel	Basel	Basel-Stadt	Stadion Rankhof	7,000
Grasshopper Club Zürich	Zürich	Zürich	Hardturm	20,000
FC La Chaux-de-Fonds	La Chaux-de-Fonds	Neuchâtel	Centre Sportif de la Charrière	12,700
FC Lausanne-Sport	Lausanne	Vaud	Pontaise	30,000
FC Locarno	Locarno	Ticino	Stadio comunale Lido	5,000
FC Lugano	Lugano	Ticino	Cornaredo Stadium	6,330
FC Nordstern Basel	Basel	Basel-Stadt	Rankhof	7,600
Servette FC	Geneva	Geneva	Stade des Charmilles	27,000
Urania Genève Sport	Genève	Geneva	Stade de Frontenex	4,000
BSC Young Boys	Bern	Bern	Wankdorf Stadium	56,000
FC Young Fellows	Zürich	Zürich	Utogrund	2,850
FC Zürich	Zürich	Zürich	Letzigrund	25,000

=== Final league table ===
Pos	Team	Pld	W	D	L	GF	GA	GD	Pts	Qualification or relegation
1	Servette	30	24	1	5	100	29	+71	49	Swiss Champions
2	Grasshopper Club	30	20	6	4	100	39	+61	46	Swiss Cup winners
3	Lugano	30	17	4	9	69	47	+22	38	
4	Bern	30	16	6	8	81	63	+18	38	
5	Basel	30	15	6	9	89	64	+25	36	
6	Lausanne-Sport	30	15	5	10	89	67	+22	35	
7	Biel-Bienne	30	14	4	12	78	68	+10	32	
8	Nordstern Basel	30	13	5	12	57	66	−9	31	
9	Young Boys	30	13	4	13	73	65	+8	30	
10	Concordia Basel	30	11	5	14	64	71	−7	27	
11	Locarno	30	11	5	14	57	66	−9	27	
12	Young Fellows Zürich	30	11	3	16	54	74	−20	25	
13	FC La Chaux-de-Fonds	30	10	3	17	46	78	−32	23	
14	Urania Genève Sport	30	8	6	16	57	85	−28	22	Relegated to 1934–35 1. Liga
15	Blue Stars	30	3	5	22	37	100	−63	11	Relegated to 1934–35 1. Liga
16	Zürich	30	4	2	24	27	96	−69	10	Relegated to 1934–35 1. Liga

Source: rsssf.com
Rules for classification: 1) Points; 2) Goal difference within the league, however with play-off for qualifiers;

=== Results ===
Home \ Away	BAS	BER	BIE	BSZ	CDF	CON	GCZ	LS	LOC	LUG	NOR	SER	UGS	YB	YFZ	ZÜR
Basel		3–2	6–2	8–2	3–0	4–1	1–2	2–2	7–1	3–1	2–1	3–1	2–2	3–2	2–5	4–0
Bern	3–2		3–1	5–2	1–1	6–3	0–0	3–1	5–3	4–2	4–5	0–5	10–2	1–0	5–2	5–1
Biel-Bienne	8–1	1–1		6–2	5–1	3–2	0–6	6–3	2–0	3–1	1–2	0–2	2–1	0–3	3–5	7–1
Blue Stars	1–5	0–2	0–3		4–5	0–2	1–5	2–1	0–2	1–3	0–1	0–1	1–1	0–2	1–1	1–1
La Chaux-de-Fonds	2–2	2–1	1–6	2–2		1–0	1–3	0–1	0–2	4–0	4–1	0–3	3–1	0–3	2–0	2–1
Concordia	0–3	3–1	3–0	0–1	5–2		4–1	3–2	2–0	1–1	1–3	1–8	2–2	5–2	2–0	5–0
Grasshopper Club	3–0	7–1	1–1	6–3	6–3	2–2		2–2	7–2	2–2	2–0	6–0	4–2	5–2	5–1	4–1
Lausanne-Sports	2–2	2–2	6–2	7–1	5–2	6–2	4–1		3–1	1–3	8–2	0–2	2–4	1–1	5–1	6–1
Locarno	3–3	3–1	2–2	1–0	2–0	8–2	1–1	1–2		1–4	4–1	0–2	9–3	2–1	0–2	3–0
Lugano	3–2	3–1	3–1	1–1	5–0	1–0	0–2	2–3	1–0		1–0	0–1	4–0	5–0	5–0	4–0
Nordstern	1–4	3–3	1–1	2–1	3–0	3–2	3–2	4–1	2–2	2–3		1–0	4–2	3–2	1–2	4–1
Servette	3–2	1–2	7–4	7–1	7–1	0–0	0–1	3–1	5–1	7–0	4–0		8–1	5–1	6–1	2–0
Urania	6–5	0–1	0–1	5–3	4–1	2–4	0–2	3–0	1–1	0–1	2–2	0–3		1–2	1–0	2–1
Young Boys	1–1	2–2	3–0	10–0	3–2	4–3	1–4	4–6	6–1	1–1	2–0	3–5	4–5		1–2	4–1
Young Fellows	2–0	3–5	1–4	5–2	1–4	3–3	3–2	2–4	1–0	6–2	3–0	0–2	1–1	1–2		0–2
Zürich	2–4	0–1	2–3	0–4	0–2	2–1	0–6	3–4	0–1	0–7	2–2	0–3	3–2	0–1	3–1	

Source: rsssf.com
Legend: Blue = home team win; Yellow = draw; Red = away team win.

=== Topscorers ===
Rank	Player	Nat.	Goals	Club
1.	Leopold Kielholz	(Switzerland)	40	Servette
2.	André Abegglen	(Switzerland)	33	Grasshopper Club
3.	Otto Haftl	(Austria)	29	Basel

== Further in Swiss football ==
- 1933–34 Swiss Cup
- 1933–34 Swiss 1. Liga

== Sources ==
- Switzerland 1933–34 at RSSSF

Preceded by 1932–33	Nationalliga seasons in Switzerland	Succeeded by 1934–35
