= 1934–35 Nationalliga =

Swiss football season

Nationalliga
- Season: 1934–35
- Dates: 26 August 1934 to 26 May 1935
- Champions: Lausanne-Sport
- Relegated: Concordia Basel; Etoile Carouge
- Matches: 182
- Top goalscorer: Englebert Bösch (Bern); 27 goals

The following is the summary of the Swiss National League in the 1934–35 football season. This was the 38th season of top-tier football in Switzerland.

== Overview ==
At this time, the Swiss Football Association (ASF/SFV) had 14 member clubs and 22 clubs in the second-tier. In the second-tier, that was an increase of four clubs compared to the previous season and the 1. Liga would be stocked up to 24 clubs in the following season.

The 14 top-tier teams played a double round-robin to decide their league table positions. Two points were awarded for a win and one point was awarded for a draw. The first placed team at the end of the season would be awarded the Swiss championship title and the last two placed teams would be relegated to the 1935–36 1. Liga. Two teams from the second tier 1. Liga would achieve promotion this season.

== Nationalliga ==
The league season began with the first matchday on 26 August 1934 and was concluded with the last round on 26 May 1935.

=== Teams, locations ===
Team	Based in	Canton	Stadium	Capacity
FC Basel	Basel	Basel-Stadt	Landhof	4,000
FC Bern	Bern	Bern	Stadion Neufeld	14,000
FC Biel-Bienne	Biel/Bienne	Bern	Stadion Gurzelen	5,500
FC Concordia Basel	Basel	Basel-Stadt	Stadion Rankhof	7,000
Étoile Carouge FC	Carouge	Geneva	Stade de la Fontenette	3,690
Grasshopper Club Zürich	Zürich	Zürich	Hardturm	20,000
FC La Chaux-de-Fonds	La Chaux-de-Fonds	Neuchâtel	Centre Sportif de la Charrière	12,700
FC Lausanne-Sport	Lausanne	Vaud	Pontaise	30,000
FC Locarno	Locarno	Ticino	Stadio comunale Lido	5,000
FC Lugano	Lugano	Ticino	Cornaredo Stadium	6,330
FC Nordstern Basel	Basel	Basel-Stadt	Rankhof	7,600
Servette FC	Geneva	Geneva	Stade des Charmilles	27,000
BSC Young Boys	Bern	Bern	Wankdorf Stadium	56,000
FC Young Fellows	Zürich	Zürich	Utogrund	2,850

=== Final league table ===
Pos	Team	Pld	W	D	L	GF	GA	GD	Pts	Qualification or relegation
1	Lausanne-Sport	26	17	7	2	69	28	+41	41	Swiss Champions and Swiss Cup winners
2	Servette	26	17	6	3	56	28	+28	40	
3	Lugano	26	14	7	5	59	31	+28	35	
4	Grasshopper Club	26	12	8	6	49	33	+16	32	
5	Basel	26	12	4	10	61	50	+11	28	
6	Bern	26	10	7	9	62	43	+19	27	
7	Biel-Bienne	26	11	5	10	48	41	+7	27	
8	Young Fellows Zürich	26	12	3	11	48	59	−11	27	
9	Locarno	26	10	6	10	45	42	+3	26	
10	La Chaux-de-Fonds	26	10	3	13	47	48	−1	23	
11	Nordstern Basel	26	8	5	13	48	49	−1	21	
12	Young Boys	26	6	5	15	46	72	−26	17	
13	Concordia Basel	26	5	4	17	36	79	−43	14	Relegated to 1935–36 1. Liga
14	Etoile Carouge	26	2	2	22	14	85	−71	6	Relegated to 1935–36 1. Liga

Source: rsssf.com
Rules for classification: 1) Points; 2) Goal difference within the league, however with play-off for qualifiers;

As Lausanne-Sport had already won the Swiss Cup two weeks earlier, on 19 May, the team won the domestic Double in this season. This was the clubs third league title and their first Double to this date.

=== Results ===
Home \ Away	BAS	BER	BB	CDF	CON	ÉTO	GCZ	LS	LOC	LUG	NOR	SER	YB	YFZ
Basel		3–1	3–2	2–3	1–2	2–0	1–0	0–1	3–0	1–1	4–1	3–2	4–1	2–2
Bern	6–0		4–1	1–0	2–0	11–1	2–2	0–2	1–3	3–2	0–2	2–2	5–0	0–1
Biel-Bienne	1–2	1–1		4–1	4–1	6–0	1–2	1–1	2–1	1–1	0–2	0–2	3–1	5–2
La Chaux-de-Fonds	4–2	4–2	2–4		4–2	6–0	0–0	0–1	4–2	0–3	2–2	0–1	4–1	3–0
Concordia	1–7	4–4	2–3	1–2		3–1	0–0	0–5	0–3	0–1	4–3	1–2	2–2	2–1
Étoile Carouge	2–2	1–2	1–2	1–0	1–1		0–6	0–4	0–3	0–1	0–2	1–2	3–1	0–1
Grasshopper Club	3–1	1–3	1–0	2–2	4–2	4–0		3–0	1–1	1–1	2–1	2–1	5–3	2–3
Lausanne-Sports	5–3	1–1	3–0	3–1	9–0	3–1	3–0		1–1	2–0	3–0	0–0	4–4	3–4
Locarno	1–0	2–2	3–0	3–0	4–0	3–0	1–1	1–2		1–5	0–2	1–1	3–1	3–4
Lugano	3–1	2–1	1–1	2–0	6–1	4–0	2–2	1–2	4–1		5–0	2–3	2–0	0–0
Nordstern	0–1	4–1	2–2	0–2	3–2	7–1	0–1	2–2	1–2	2–4		1–1	4–4	0–1
Servette	3–0	3–2	2–1	3–1	3–1	2–0	0–1	1–1	4–0	0–0	3–2		3–2	4–2
Young Boys	4–4	0–4	0–1	3–2	2–0	3–1	3–2	2–5	1–1	4–0	1–0	2–6		0–3
Young Fellows	1–9	1–1	0–2	3–0	2–4	4–0	2–1	2–3	2–1	4–6	1–5	0–2	2–1	

Source: rsssf.com
Legend: Blue = home team win; Yellow = draw; Red = away team win.

=== Topscorers ===
Rank	Player	Nat.	Goals	Club
1.	Englebert Bösch	(Switzerland)	27	Bern
2.	Lauro Amadò	(Switzerland)	23	Lugano
3.	Otto Haftl	(Austria)	21	Basel
3.	István Grósz	(Hungary)	21	Lausanne-Sports
5.	Alessandro Frigerio	(Switzerland)	20	Young Fellows
5.	Leopold Kielholz	(Switzerland)	20	Servette
7.	Albert Büche	(Switzerland)	19	Nordstern

== Further in Swiss football ==
- 1934–35 Swiss Cup
- 1934–35 Swiss 1. Liga

== Sources ==
- Switzerland 1934–35 at RSSSF

Preceded by 1933–34	Nationalliga seasons in Switzerland	Succeeded by 1935–36
