= Christopher Mfuyi =

Congolese footballer (born 1989)

Personal information
- Full name: Christopher Nzay Mfuyi
- Date of birth: 3 July 1989 (age 37)
- Place of birth: Geneva, Switzerland
- Height: 1.84 m (6 ft 1/2 in)
- Position: Centre back

Team information
- Current team: FC Collex-Bossy

Youth career
- 2005–2007: Servette

Senior career*
Years	Team	Apps	(Gls)
2007–2010	Servette	21	(1)
2008–2009	→ Chênois (loan)	10	(1)
2010–2012	Valenciennes	0	(0)
2012–2020	Servette	171	(4)
2019–2020	→ Stade Lausanne-Ouchy (loan)	15	(0)
2020–2022	Étoile Carouge	4	(1)
2022–	FC Collex-Bossy	1	(0)

International career
2010	Congo DR	2	(0)
- * Club domestic league appearances and goals as of 2 September 2022

Christopher Nzay Mfuyi (born 3 July 1989) is a footballer who plays as a centre back for Swiss club FC Collex-Bossy. Born in Switzerland, he represented Congo DR at international level.

== Career ==
Born in Geneva, Mfuyi previously played for Servette from 2006 to 2010 in the Swiss Challenge League, and also had a loan stint at CS Chênois during the 2008–09 season.

In July 2010, Mfuyi signed a four-year contract with Ligue 1 club Valenciennes. He had limited opportunities with Valenciennes' first team, and after two years, it was announced on 21 June 2012 that Mfuyi would return to Servette, his hometown club, on a two-year contract. On 17 July 2015 it was announced that Mfuyi had signed a two-year contract with Servette, with an option for a third year.
