= Claude Mariétan =

Swiss footballer (born 1953)

Personal information
- Date of birth: 17 September 1953 (age 73)
- Place of birth: Geneva, Switzerland
- Position: Defender

Senior career*
Years	Team	Apps	(Gls)
1970-1972	Servette	3	(1)
1973-1977	CS Chênois		

Managerial career
- 1993-1994: FC Bulle
- 2008: FC Sion (assistant)
- FC Monthey
- * Club domestic league appearances and goals

Claude Mariétan (born 17 September 1953) is a Swiss former professional footballer who played as a defender. He last worked as head coach of Monthey.

== Career ==
Marietan started his senior career with Servette in the Nationalliga A, where he made three league appearances and scored zero goals. After that, he played for CS Chênois.
