= 1934–35 Swiss 1. Liga =

1. Liga
- Season: 1934–35
- Champions: 1. Liga champions: St. Gallen; Group West winners: Aarau; Group East winners: St. Gallen
- Promoted: St. Gallen; Aarau
- Relegated: Old Boys; Bellinzona
- Matches: twice 110 plus 2 play-offs total: 222 matches

The 1934–35 1. Liga season was the 4th season of the 1. Liga since its creation in 1931. At this time, the 1. Liga was the second-tier of the Swiss football league system.

== Overview ==
There were further changes in the league system in advance of this season. There were now 22 clubs that competed in the 1. Liga. That was an increase of four clubs compared to the previous season. The 1. Liga would be stocked up to 24 clubs in the following season.

The 22 clubs were divided into two regional groups, each with 11 teams. The teams in each group played a double round-robin to decide their league position. Two points were awarded for a win and one point was awarded for a draw. Both group winners were promoted to the top-tier Nationalliga, but they then contested a play-off round to decide the title of 1. Liga champions. The last placed team in each group were directly relegated to the 2. Liga (third tier).

== Group West ==
=== Teams, locations ===
Club	Based in	Canton	Stadium	Capacity
FC Aarau	Aarau	Aargau	Stadion Brügglifeld	9,240
FC Cantonal Neuchâtel	Neuchâtel	Neuchâtel	Stade de la Maladière	25,500
FC Fribourg	Fribourg	Fribourg	Stade Universitaire	9,000
FC Grenchen	Grenchen	Solothurn	Stadium Brühl	15,100
FC Monthey	Monthey	Valais	Stade Philippe Pottier	1,800
FC Montreux-Sports	Montreux	Vaud	Stade de Chailly	1,000
BSC Old Boys	Basel	Basel-Stadt	Stadion Schützenmatte	8,000
FC Olten	Olten	Solothurn	Sportanlagen Kleinholz	8,000
Racing Club Lausanne	Lausanne	Vaud	Centre sportif de la Tuilière	1,000
FC Solothurn	Solothurn	Solothurn	Stadion FC Solothurn	6,750
Urania Genève Sport	Genève	Geneva	Stade de Frontenex	4,000

=== Final league table ===
Pos	Team	Pld	W	D	L	GF	GA	GD	Pts	Qualification or relegation
1	FC Aarau	20	15	0	5	56	25	+31	30	Promotion to 1935–36 Nationalliga, play-off for title
2	FC Grenchen	20	11	1	8	42	29	+13	23	
3	FC Olten	20	10	2	8	38	30	+8	22	
4	FC Montreux-Sports	20	9	4	7	40	42	−2	22	
5	FC Solothurn	20	9	2	9	46	41	+5	20	
6	FC Cantonal Neuchâtel	20	8	4	8	40	43	−3	20	
7	Racing Club Lausanne	20	8	2	10	41	41	0	18	
8	FC Fribourg	20	8	2	10	36	49	−13	18	
9	Urania Genève Sport	20	8	2	10	51	54	−3	18	
10	FC Monthey	20	8	2	10	34	52	−18	18	
11	BSC Old Boys	20	5	1	14	37	55	−18	11	Relegation to 2. Liga

Source: RSSSF
Rules for classification: 1) Points; 2) Goal difference within the league, but decider play-off for qualifiers.

== Group East ==
=== Teams, locations ===
Club	Based in	Canton	Stadium	Capacity
AC Bellinzona	Bellinzona	Ticino	Stadio Comunale Bellinzona	5,000
FC Blue Stars Zürich	Zürich	Zürich	Hardhof	1,000
SC Brühl	St. Gallen	St. Gallen	Paul-Grüninger-Stadion	4,200
FC Chiasso	Chiasso	Ticino	Stadio Comunale Riva IV	4,000
SC Juventus Zürich	Zürich	Zürich	Utogrund	2,850
FC Kreuzlingen	Kreuzlingen	Thurgau	Sportplatz Hafenareal	1,200
FC Luzern	Lucerne	Lucerne	Stadion Allmend	25,000
FC Seebach Zürich	Zürich	Zürich	Eichrain	1,000
Sparta-Schaffhausen	Schaffhausen	Schaffhausen	Stadion Breite	7,300
FC St. Gallen	St. Gallen	St. Gallen	Espenmoos	11,000
FC Zürich	Zürich	Zürich	Letzigrund	25,000

=== Final league table ===
Pos	Team	Pld	W	D	L	GF	GA	GD	Pts	Qualification or relegation
1	FC St. Gallen	20	12	4	4	49	22	+27	28	Promotion to 1935–36 Nationalliga, play-off for title
2	FC Luzern	20	12	3	5	54	32	+22	27	
3	SC Brühl	20	12	2	6	45	29	+16	26	
4	FC Kreuzlingen	20	11	1	8	47	31	+16	23	
5	Sparta-Schaffhausen	20	9	3	8	39	35	+4	21	
6	FC Chiasso	20	8	3	9	42	53	−11	19	
7	FC Seebach Zürich	20	8	2	10	44	53	−9	18	
8	FC Blue Stars Zürich	20	7	3	10	33	39	−6	17	
9	SC Juventus Zürich	20	7	1	12	38	50	−12	15	
10	FC Zürich	20	5	4	11	31	53	−22	14	
11	AC Bellinzona	20	5	2	13	26	51	−25	12	Relegation to 2. Liga

Source: RSSSF
Rules for classification: 1) Points; 2) Goal difference within the league, but decider play-off for qualifiers.

== 1. Liga championship play-off ==
The two group winners had achieved promotion to the 1935–36 Nationalliga. They now played a two legged tie for the title of 1. Liga champions. The games were played on 2 and 16 June 1935.

Team 1	Score	Team 2
St. Gallen	1–1	Aarau
Aarau	1–2	St. Gallen

St. Gallen won the 1. Liga championship title.

== Further in Swiss football ==
- 1934–35 Nationalliga
- 1934–35 Swiss Cup

== Sources ==
- Switzerland 1934–35 at RSSSF

Preceded by 1933–34	Seasons in Swiss 1. Liga	Succeeded by 1935–36
