= Albert Büche =

Swiss footballer (1911–?)

Personal information
- Date of birth: 1911
- Position: Forward

Senior career*
Years	Team	Apps	(Gls)
- FC Nordstern Basel

International career
1931	Switzerland	5	(2)
- * Club domestic league appearances and goals

Albert Büche (born 1911, date of death unknown) was a Swiss footballer who played as a forward for FC Nordstern Basel. He was a squad member for Switzerland in the 1934 FIFA World Cup. Büche is deceased.
