= Albert Guinchard =

Swiss footballer (1914-1971)

Personal information
- Date of birth: 10 November 1914
- Date of death: 19 May 1971 (aged 56)
- Position: Midfielder

Senior career*
Years	Team	Apps	(Gls)
1931–1947	Servette FC		

International career
1934–1941	Switzerland	12	(0)

Managerial career
- 1936–1937: Servette FC
- * Club domestic league appearances and goals

Albert Guinchard (10 November 1914 – 19 May 1971) was a Swiss footballer who played for Switzerland in the FIFA World Cup in 1934 and 1938. He also played for Servette FC.
