= Karl Rappan =

Austrian footballer (1905–1996)

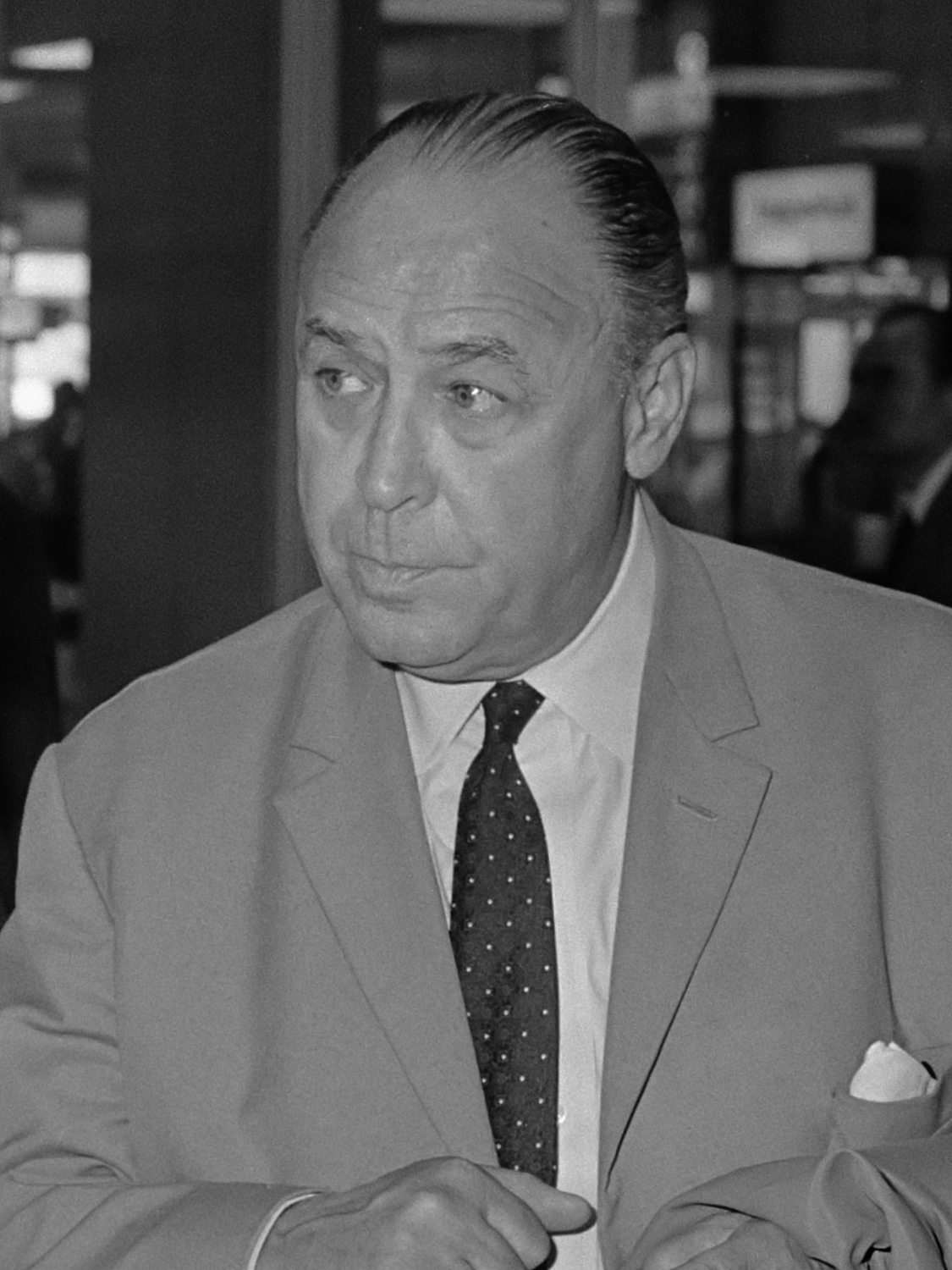
- Rappan in 1969

Personal information
- Date of birth: 26 September 1905
- Place of birth: Vienna, Austria-Hungary
- Date of death: 2 January 1996 (aged 90)
- Place of death: Bern, Switzerland
- Positions: Half-back; forward

Youth career
- 1922–1924: SV Donau Wien

Senior career*
Years	Team	Apps	(Gls)
1924–1928	SC Wacker Vienna		
1928–1929	Austria Wien		
1929–1930	Rapid Wien	6	(2)
1931–1935	Servette		

International career
1927	Austria	2	(1)

Managerial career
- 1931–1935: Servette (player-coach)
- 1935–1948: Grasshoppers
- 1937–1938: Switzerland
- 1942–1949: Switzerland
- 1948–1957: Servette
- 1953–1954: Switzerland
- 1958–1959: Zürich
- 1960–1963: Switzerland
- 1964–1968: Lausanne-Sport
- 1970–1971: Rapid Wien (technical director)
- * Club domestic league appearances and goals

Karl Rappan (26 September 1905 – 2 January 1996) was an Austrian footballer and coach. He played and managed mostly in Switzerland, where he won multiple titles. He had four tenures as coach of the Switzerland national team, which he managed in three World Cups, and is the all-time leader in matches won as coach of the Swiss team. He introduced a major football strategy known as the "bolt", which gave origin to the catenaccio system. He also helped create the UEFA Intertoto Cup.

== Playing career ==
Rappan, born in Vienna, played as a half and forward. As a teenager, he played for the club Donau Wien. In 1924, he joined Wacker Vienna, where he played four years. He was selected to the Austria national team in while at Wacker. He then played one season at each of the clubs Austria Wien and Rapid Wien, winning the 1929–30 Austrian league with the latter. Rappan then moved to Switzerland, where he started playing for Servette in 1931, becoming a player-coach until his retirement as a player in 1935, and winning the Swiss league twice with the club, in 1933 and 1934.

In 1927, he was capped twice for the Austria national team, scoring one goal, against Hungary in a 6–0 win.

== Coaching career ==
Rappan spent almost all of his managerial career – which extended from 1932 to 1963 – coaching Swiss teams and the Switzerland national team. After his role as player-coach at Servette, Rappan became a full-time coach and joined Grasshopper Club Zürich, managing the Zürich club from 1935 to 1948, and winning five domestic league titles and seven cups. In 1948, he returned to Servette for a second period at the club, now as coach only. He remained there until 1957, adding one more league title and one cup to his palmares.

After Servette, Rappan had a one-season spell at FC Zürich. From 1960 to 1963, he coached the Switzerland national team exclusively, and after this last period in charge of the national squad, he joined club Lausanne-Sport, being their coach from 1964 to 1968, and winning one league title in 1965. After almost four decades of service in Swiss football, he returned to Austria to be the technical director of Rapid Wien – his former club as a player – for the 1969–70 season.

=== The "bolt" ===
During the early 1930s, when the use of the "WM" system was spreading, Rappan developed a tactical system under which players switched positions and duties depending on the game's pattern. The system varied largely from the classic 2-3-5 formation and the WM, focusing in defense. The team would fold back into its own half and wait for the opponent's attack, conceding possession of the midfield. The system received the name of verrou or "bolt". It has also been called "Swiss bolt". Reportedly, Rappan looked for a system that was less rigid and less dependent on individual talent than the WM. It relied on collective work, and gave the amateurs of the time a chance to compensate to some extent for their lack of skill. The defensive strategy of the bolt relied on a mixture of zonal and man-marking. It was the first system to play four players in defense, using one of them as a "security bolt" supporting the other three. It is acknowledged that the bolt largely influenced the catenaccio (Italian for bolt) and its use of the libero (sweeper) in defense.

Rappan's system was never fully understood by many people at the time, and the coach himself never discussed it, keeping a certain mystery around it. It received both praise and criticism. The system did demonstrate to be successful at the 1938 World Cup. Switzerland eliminated Germany in the first round, where the match that ended in a 1–1 draw was replayed, with the Swiss winning the second match 4–2. Two weeks prior to the World Cup, Switzerland had defeated England in a friendly match.

=== Switzerland national team ===
Rappan had four different tenures as head coach of the Switzerland national team: 1937 to 1938, 1942 to 1949, 1953 to 1954, and 1960 to 1963. He managed Switzerland in 77 international matches, the most ever by any Swiss team coach. He won 29 matches, also a record, and lost 36 times, second-most all-time.

With Rappan as its coach, Switzerland qualified to the World Cups of 1938, 1954 (where they beat Italy and lost 7–5 to Austria in quarterfinals), and 1962. Rappan recorded three wins, one draw, and six losses as a coach in World Cup finals tournaments.

His last match as Switzerland's coach was on 11 November 1963 against France in Paris, a 2–2 draw.

== After retirement ==
Rappan, who had the idea of creating a European league, helped Ernst Thommen, the Managing Director for the Swiss Football Pool, conceive the UEFA Intertoto Cup, which started in 1961.

Rappan died on 2 January 1996 in Bern.

== Honours ==
=== As a player ===
Rapid Wien

- Austrian league: 1929–30

Servette

- Swiss league: 1932–33, 1933–34

=== As coach ===
Grasshoppers

- Swiss league: 1936–37, 1938–39, 1941–42, 1942–43, 1944–45
- Swiss cup: 1936–37, 1937–38, 1939–40, 1940–41, 1941–42, 1942–43, 1945–46

Servette

- Swiss league: 1949-50
- Swiss cup: 1948-49

== See also ==
- Catenaccio
