= Charlie Handley =

English footballer

Personal information
- Full name: Charles Harold James Handley
- Date of birth: 15 April 1899
- Place of birth: Edmonton, England
- Date of death: 1957 (aged 57–58)
- Height: 5 ft 7 in (1.70 m)
- Position: Winger

Youth career
- Edmonton Juniors

Senior career*
Years	Team	Apps	(Gls)
1921–1929	Tottenham Hotspur	121	(26)
1929–1930	Swansea Town	19	(4)
1930	Sittingbourne		
1930–1931	Sheppey United		
1931–1932	Thames	29	(3)
1932	Sittingbourne		
1932	Norwich City		
1932–19??	Berne		
- * Club domestic league appearances and goals

Charles Harold James Handley (15 April 1899 – 1957) was an English professional footballer who played as a winger in the Football League for Tottenham Hotspur, Swansea Town and Thames.

== History ==
Handley was born in Edmonton, North London and, as a youngster, trained with his father in their back garden. After trying out at local team, Edmonton Juniors, Handley went on to play for other minor clubs but finally after enrolling in the Spurs youth before being called up by then current manager Peter McWilliam. From 1921 to 1929, Charlie "Tich" Handley played for Tottenham Hotspur. He and Jimmy Dimmock another well known player were Tottenham's best strikers in that decade.
