= Servette FC =

Association football club in Switzerland

Servette
- Full name: Association du Servette Football Club
- Nickname: Les Grenats (The Garnets)
- Founded: 17 January 1900; 126 years ago
- Ground: Stade de Genève
- Capacity: 30,084
- Owner: 1890 Foundation
- Chairman: Hervé Boch
- Coach: Jocelyn Gourvennec
- League: Swiss Super League
- 2025–26: Swiss Super League, 8th of 12
- Website: www.servettefc.ch
Home colours	Away colours	Third colours

Servette Football Club is a Swiss professional football club based in Geneva, founded in March 1890 with rugby as its first sporting activity, and named after the Geneva district of the same name. The football section was created on 17 January 1900. They play in the Swiss Super League.

Servette is one of Switzerland's most successful clubs and the most successful Romandy club, winning 17 national titles, as well as 8 Swiss cups. Founded in 1890, the team has spent the majority of its history in the top flight of Swiss football, regularly contesting for the title. They are rivals with FC Lausanne-Sport and FC Sion.

However, after their last league title in 1999, Servette began experiencing financial problems, which led to a turbulent decade. The club was relegated to the third division in 2004–05 due to a bankruptcy, but achieved promotion to the Swiss Challenge League after the 2005–06 season, where the club remained until 2011. Servette earned promotion to the Swiss Super League after defeating Bellinzona in a relegation/promotion playoff on 31 May 2011. The club finished fourth in its first season back in the top flight, thereby gaining entrance to the Europa League second round qualification round for the 2012–13 season. However, they were relegated at the end of the 2013 season. They returned to the Swiss first tier in 2019, being promoted as Challenge League champions with a 15 points lead in front of the 2nd ranked FC Aarau.

== History ==
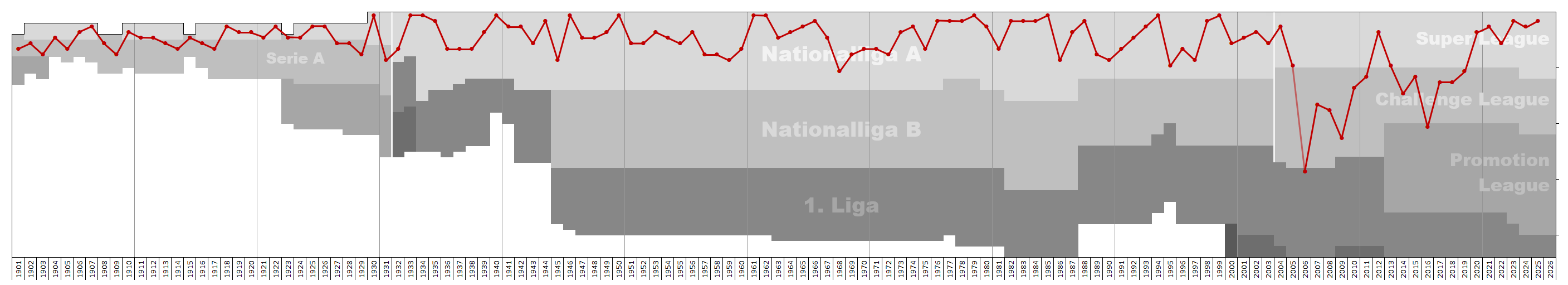
Chart of FC Servette table positions in the Swiss football league system

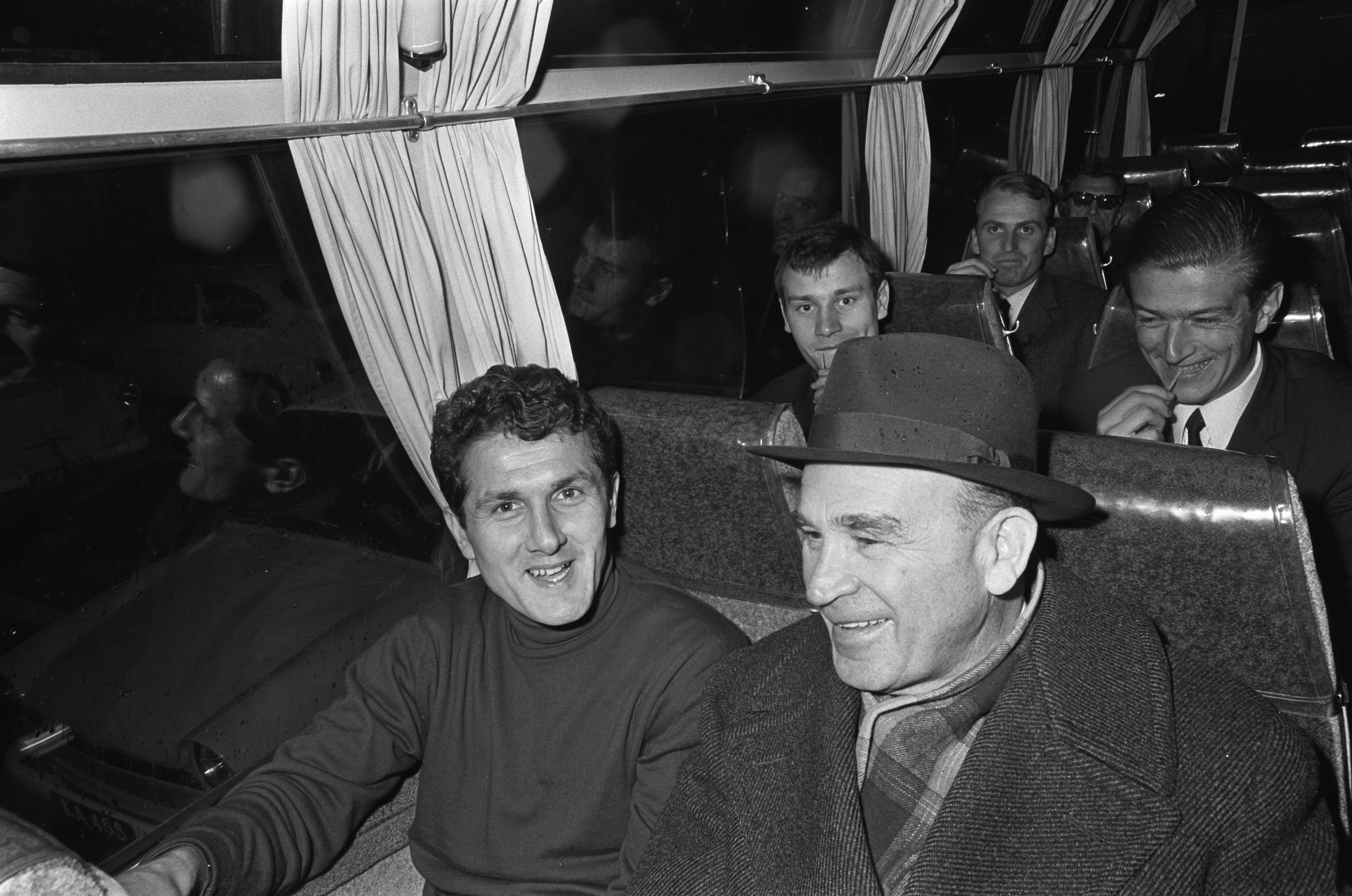
FC Servette defender Jean-Claude Schindelholz with coach Béla Guttmann on a bus in Holland, 1966.

=== Early years to bankruptcy ===
Founded in 1890, Servette are one of the most prolific Swiss football clubs, having won 17 Swiss league championships and seven Swiss cups. Servette was also the winner of the Torneo Internazionale Stampa Sportiva, one of the first international football competitions in the world, in 1908. In 1930, Servette organized the Coupe des Nations, predecessor of the UEFA Champions League.

The club was originally founded as the "Football Club de la Servette", a rugby football team based in the Genevan neighbourhood of the same name. Due to the dwindling popularity of this sport in Switzerland, a football section of the club was created, leading to its integration in the Swiss Football Association in 1900.

Led by Umberto Barberis and Claude "Didi" Andrey, in 1978–1979 the club won all of the competitions it entered – with the exception of the European Cup Winners' Cup where they were eliminated in the quarter-finals on away goals by Fortuna Düsseldorf, that year's finalist. Barberis later became French champion in 1982 with AS Monaco.

Until its bankruptcy, Servette was the only Swiss club to have remained in the top league since its creation in 1890. Servette remained the only club to have never been relegated for sporting reasons, until they finished last in the 2012–2013 season.

=== Bankruptcy and revival ===
Old Servette FC Logo

On 4 February 2005, the parent company of the club was declared bankrupt. It had run debts of over 10 million Swiss francs, having not paid the players since the previous November, and consequently the club suffered an exodus of players looking for paying clubs. As a consequence of the bankruptcy Servette Under 21s took over the club name playing two divisions below the original Servette team in 1. Liga, a fate already experienced by regional rivals Lausanne Sports in 2003, and continued to play at the Stade de Geneve in front of smaller crowds.

In the 2005–06 season, a rejuvenated Servette secured promotion to the Challenge League, the second highest division in Switzerland.

In the 2010–11 season, Servette finished 2nd in the Challenge League, thereby qualifying for a relegation/promotion play-off against Super League team AC Bellinzona. Servette lost the initial match in Bellinzona 1–0, but won the return match 3–1 and winning the tie 3–2 on aggregate, securing promotion to the Swiss Super League.

=== 2011 to 2018 ===
During the Summer 2011 transfer window, Servette FC made very few signings, considering the club had been promoted from the second division to the Super League. Barroca, Issaga Diallo, Carlos Saleiro and Abdoulaye Fall (the latter failed to receive a work permit) were signed as permanent transfers, in addition to Ishmael Yartey and Roderick Miranda joining the club on loan from Benfica. Costinha, a former Portugal international and Champions League winner with FC Porto, was appointed as the club's Sporting Director, after he had been previously fired by Lisbon-based Sporting CP. With a largely unchanged squad from their previous season in the second division, Servette achieved very impressive results in the first half of the season, including victories over FC Zurich, BSC Young Boys, Neuchatel Xamax, FC Lucerne, local rivals FC Lausanne-Sport and a 4–0 away win over arch-rivals FC Sion. Despite achieving overall impressive results in the first half of the season, manager João Alves was fired, and was replaced by his compatriot João Pereira, to the disappointment of many of Servette's supporters.

In December 2011, reports surfaced that Servette was unable to pay players' salaries, in addition to other expenses. In January 2012, one of the club's star performers and leading goalscorers, Matías Vitkieviez, was sold to Young Boys for only 150,000 CHF. In February 2012, Servette filed for bankruptcy a second time. On 12 March 2012, chairman Majid Pishyar sold the club to a consortium headed by Hugh Quennec, president of the city's hockey club, Genève-Servette HC. The club was initially given one month to secure the funding necessary to come out of bankruptcy proceedings, and was successful in doing so. Pishyar remained as "honorary president" through the end of the 2011–12 season.

In April 2012, the decision was made to reinstate manager João Alves, who had achieved promotion and impressive results in the first half of the season, and to fire his replacement João Pereira, who had failed to improve the club's results. Alves' return immediately led to improved results, and the club finished the season's final five matches with four wins and one draw. This included a 2–1 victory over FC Basel on the final day of the season, which ended a run of 17 consecutive losses against FC Basel dating back to 2001, as well as ending Basel's 26 match unbeaten streak. The victory also meant that Servette secured fourth place in their first season back in Switzerland's top flight, granting Servette entry into the second round of qualifying for the 2012–13 UEFA Europa League. The season ended with further good news, as on 24 May 2012, the Swiss Football League granted Servette its license for the 2012–13 season, thus marking the end of Servette's financial worries for the time being.

Servette announced that it would be preparing for the 2012–13 season with friendly matches against Thun, Shakhtar Donetsk, Yverdon-Sport, Étoile Carouge, Lausanne-Sport and Porto. In the transfer market, Servette sold Stéphane Nater and Carlos Saleiro, while Ishmael Yartey and Roderick Miranda were recalled to Benfica from their loan spells. Servette bolstered its ranks by signing Geoffrey Tréand, Alexandre Pasche, Christopher Mfuyi, Kevin Gissi, Simone Grippo, Mike Gomes, and Samir Ramizi. Servette also brought in Genséric Kusunga, Steven Lang, and Kelvin on loan for the season.

On 12 July 2012, it was confirmed that Servette would face Gandzasar FC in the second round of qualifying for the 2012–13 UEFA Europa League. The club won the tie 5–1, progressing to face Rosenborg BK in the third qualifier round, against whom they were eliminated on away goals. Servette's league campaign, meanwhile, went poorly, and the club was relegated (for sporting reasons) for the first time in its 113-year history in May 2013, following a 3–0 away defeat by relegation rivals FC Lausanne-Sport.

On 14 July 2013, Servette began the 2013–14 season in the Swiss Challenge League with a 2–1 win at FC Wohlen.

After finishing 2nd in the 2014–15 Swiss Challenge League, the Swiss Football League refused Servette FC a Challenge League licence meaning that Servette would play in the 1st Promotion League (third tier) during 2015–16. In June 2015 the club held a press conference where it was revealed that Servette FC had new owners – 1890 Foundation – holding 100% of the capital stock of SFC SA. At the same press conference it was declared that 1890 Foundation was a private foundation subject to scrutiny by the public supervisory authority.

While Kevin Cooper stayed on as coach, many players left. On 3 November 2015, Servette FC announced that Kevin Cooper had left the club and William Niederhauser and Thierry Cotting would be temporarily in charge of first team affairs. In January 2016 the club announced that Anthony Braizat had taken charge of first team affairs.

=== 2018 to present ===
In 2018, Servette hired Alain Geiger as its manager and achieved promotion back to the Swiss Super League as the 2018–2019 Challenge League champions, with a 15-point lead in front of 2nd ranked FC Aarau. For the first time in more than 15 years, the club has since enjoyed relative stability at the financial, managerial and sport levels, achieving a 4th-place finish in the 2019–2020 Super League, a 3rd place in 2020–2021, a 6th place in 2021–2022 and even a 2nd place in 2022–2023, giving it for the first time a shot for the Champions League.

On 20 March 2023, Servette announced that the current season would be Geiger's last, with René Weiler being chosen to take over for the 2023–2024 season. Weiler led Servette to their first Swiss Cup final since 2001. On 2 June 2024, Servette won the cup final after a penalty shoot-out against FC Lugano, winning their first title in 23 years.

On 10 June 2024, the club announced a new organizational structure, with Weiler stepping down as head coach and instead taking over as sporting director. He is replaced by Thomas Häberli as head coach. Hervé Boch will be the new chairman.

On 4 August 2025, Häberli was relieved of his duties, after a poor start to the 2025–26 season. He was replaced a week later by Jocelyn Gourvennec.

== Stadium ==
The home ground of Servette is the Stade de Genève. It was inaugurated on 16 March 2003 after three years of construction. The opening match was played between Servette and Young Boys. With an all-seater capacity of 30,084, the Stade de Genève is the third largest stadium in Switzerland, and hosted three group matches in the 2008 European Football Championship.

Servette moved to the Stade de Genève from their old ground, the Stade des Charmilles, in 2003. The Charmilles was inaugurated on 28 June 1930, with the first game drawing a crowd of 14,000 on the first match of the Coupe des Nations. The official capacity peaked at 30,000, but a record 40,000 spectators managed to squeeze in for the international game between Switzerland and France on 14 October 1951. Flood lights were installed in 1977 and the stands were entirely covered in 1983. The capacity gradually diminished from the 1980s onward, first to 20,000 in 1985 and then to 9,250 in 1998 when the stadium became an all-seater.

Plans for a new stadium were first launched in 1984, in response to the Charmilles becoming increasingly outdated and run down. A project committee was established in 1992, which proposed to either rebuild the stadium over the course of four years or construct a new stadium elsewhere in Geneva. Meanwhile, with more substantial plans failing to materialize, the poor state of the old stadium became apparent when the main stand, the Tribune A, was declared unsafe in 1995 and closed off. A renovation project began the following year, which saw the main stand re-opened and seats eventually being installed throughout the stadium. Servette would secure another Swiss Championship and a Cup trophy while playing at the Charmilles, before construction on the new Stade de Genève finally commenced in 2000. The last match was played on 8 December 2002 in front of a capacity crowd.

== Current squad ==
As of 9 September 2026

Note: Flags indicate national team as defined under FIFA eligibility rules; some limited exceptions apply. Players may hold more than one non-FIFA nationality.

No.	Pos.	Nation	Player
1	GK	LTU	Edvinas Gertmonas
4	DF	SUI	Steve Rouiller
6	MF	BRA	Pedro Naressi
7	FW	ZAM	Kingstone Mutandwa (on loan from Cagliari)
8	MF	FRA	Timothé Cognat
9	MF	BIH	Miroslav Stevanović
11	MF	FRA	Lamine Fomba
14	DF	CMR	Lilian Njoh
15	DF	SUI	Marco Burch
17	DF	GBS	Houboulang Mendes
18	DF	CGO	Bradley Mazikou
19	DF	FRA	Yoan Severin
20	MF	SUI	Jarell Simo
21	FW	SWE	Jesper Karlsson (on loan from Bologna)
22	FW	FRA	Mathis Lambourde
23	DF	SUI	Quentin Maceiras

No.	Pos.	Nation	Player
25	DF	TUN	Dylan Bronn
27	FW	CIV	David Datro Fofana
28	MF	FRA	David Douline
30	MF	GAM	Ablie Jallow
32	GK	SUI	Jérémy Frick (captain)
34	DF	FRA	Téo Allix
35	MF	SUI	Alonzo Vincent
36	MF	FRA	Thomas Lopes
37	DF	BRA	Sylvain Djoho
38	FW	FRA	Benoît Sida
41	FW	FRA	Tristan Nunez
42	MF	SUI	Ivan Izquierdo
44	GK	SUI	Louis Rieder
77	FW	SUI	Tiemoko Ouattara
78	GK	KOS	Léo Besson
90	FW	SVK	Samuel Mráz

=== Out on loan ===
Note: Flags indicate national team as defined under FIFA eligibility rules; some limited exceptions apply. Players may hold more than one non-FIFA nationality.

No.	Pos.	Nation	Player
—	GK	SUI	Marwan Aubert (at Nyon until 30 June 2027)
—	DF	SUI	Samuel Fankhauser (at Nyon until 30 June 2027)
—	DF	SUI	Romain Gaud (at Grand-Saconnex until 30 June 2027)
—	DF	SUI	Romeo Philippin (at Nyon until 30 June 2027)
—	DF	SUI	Luca Scandurra (at Grand-Saconnex until 30 June 2027)
—	DF	ALB	Leart Zuka (at Étoile Carouge until 30 June 2027)
—	MF	FRA	Mattéo Anselme (at Grand-Saconnex until 30 June 2027)

No.	Pos.	Nation	Player
—	MF	SUI	Malek Ishuayed (at Kriens until 30 June 2027)
—	MF	SUI	Émilien Ndjoko (at Nyon until 30 June 2027)
—	FW	SUI	Jamie Atangana (at Lausanne Ouchy until 30 June 2027)
—	FW	COD	Junior Kadile (at Lens until 30 June 2027)
—	FW	SUI	Mardochée Miguel (at Nyon until 30 June 2027)
—	FW	BFA	Fadi Ndiyo (at Grand-Saconnex until 30 June 2027)
—	FW	POR	Keyan Varela (at RKC Waalwijk until 30 June 2027)

=== Servette U21 ===
Note: Flags indicate national team as defined under FIFA eligibility rules; some limited exceptions apply. Players may hold more than one non-FIFA nationality.

No.	Pos.	Nation	Player
1	GK	SUI	Jules Tomas
4	DF	SUI	Samuel Fankhauser
6	MF	SUI	Jarell Simo
7	MF	SUI	Maxim Leclercq
7	MF	SUI	Vasco Tritten
8	MF	SUI	Adriatik Salihi
8	MF	SUI	Fred Annor-Mensah
8	FW	SUI	Lois Adema
9	FW	SUI	Luca Sesito

No.	Pos.	Nation	Player
12	MF	SUI	Ryan Guillaume
14	MF	FRA	Rayan Benammar
14	FW	SUI	Oussenyou Sene
16	DF	FRA	Mae Clavel
16	FW	COM	Mhoumadi Aziahr
18	GK	SUI	Marcel Lapierre
19	FW	FRA	Omar Daf
27	DF	FRA	Christopher Routis
—	DF	SUI	Mahir Rizvanovic

== Notable former players ==
- (Switzerland) Lucien Favre
- (Switzerland) Alain Geiger
- (Switzerland) Jean-Philippe Karlen
- (Switzerland) Denis Zakaria
- (Switzerland) Claude Mariétan
- (Switzerland) Anthony Sauthier
- (Switzerland) Philippe Senderos
- (Switzerland) François Moubandje
- (Switzerland) Alexander Frei
- (Switzerland) Kastriot Imeri
- (Switzerland) Kevin Mbabu
- (Switzerland) David Sesa
- (Switzerland) Julian Esteban
- (Switzerland) Alexandre Jankewitz
- (Switzerland) François Moubandje
- (Switzerland) Marco Grassi
- (Romania) Răzvan Câtînic
- (Bosnia and Herzegovina) Alen Škoro
- (Bosnia and Herzegovina) Aleksandar Bratić
- (Bulgaria) Martin Petrov
- (England) Martin Chivers
- (France) Christian Karembeu
- (France) Gaël Clichy
- (France) Grejohn Kyei
- (Germany) Karl-Heinz Rummenigge
- (Germany) Oliver Neuville
- (Netherlands) Alex Schalk
- (Portugal) Diogo Monteiro
- (Chile) Jorge Valdivia
- (Brazil) Hilton
- (Brazil) Sonny Anderson
- (Brazil) Eudis
- (Bolivia) Boris Céspedes
- (Cameroon) Jean-Pierre Nsame
- (Nigeria) Wilson Oruma
- (Democratic Republic of the Congo) Christopher Mfuyi
- (Denmark) John Eriksen

== Staff ==
Head coach

- Jocelyn Gourvennec

Assistant Coach

- Bojan Dimic

Attacking Coach

- Alexander Alfonso

Goalkeeper Coach

- Daniel Blanco

== Honours ==
- Swiss Super League
  - Winners (17): 1906–07, 1917–18, 1921–22, 1924–25, 1925–26, 1929–30, 1932–33, 1933–34, 1939–40, 1945–46, 1949–50, 1960–61, 1961–62, 1978–79, 1984–85, 1993–94, 1998–99
  - Runners-up (18): 1905–06, 1909–10, 1914–15, 1918–19, 1919–20, 1934–35, 1943–44, 1965–66, 1975–76, 1976–77, 1977–78, 1981–82, 1982–83, 1983–84, 1987–88, 1997–98, 2022–23, 2024–25
- Swiss Cup
  - Winners (8): 1927–28, 1948–49, 1970–71, 1977–78, 1978–79, 1983–84, 2000–01, 2023–24
  - Runners-up (12): 1933–34, 1935–36, 1937–38, 1940–41, 1958–59, 1964–65, 1965–66, 1975–76, 1982–83, 1985–86, 1986–87, 1995–96
- Swiss League Cup
  - Winners (3): 1976–77, 1978–79, 1979–80 (Record)
- Swiss Challenge League
  - Winners (1): 2018–19,
  - Runners-up (2): 2010–11, 2014–15
- 1. Liga Promotion
  - Winners (1): 2015–16
- Torneo Internazionale Stampa Sportiva
  - Winners (1): 1908
- Tournoi du Nouvel An du Stade Français et Club Français
  - Winners (1): 1925
- Swiss Super League Fair Play Trophy: 2022–23

=== European record ===
- European Cup Winners' Cup
  - Quarter-final: 1966–67, 1978–79
- UEFA Conference League
  - Round of 16: 2023–24
- UEFA Cup
  - Round of 16: 1982–83, 2001–02

== European record ==
=== UEFA club competition record ===
As of 15 August 2023

Competition	Pld	W	D	L	GF	GA
UEFA Champions League	24	6	9	9	36	42
UEFA Europa League	46	19	11	16	62	48
UEFA Conference League	2	1	0	1	2	3
UEFA Cup Winners' Cup	24	11	4	9	36	25
Inter-Cities Fairs Cup	10	1	3	6	13	29
Total	106	38	26	42	149	149

Pld = Matches played; W = Matches won; D = Matches drawn; L = Matches lost; GF = Goals for; GA = Goals against. Defunct competitions indicated in italics.

=== Matches ===
Season	Competition	Round	Opponent	Home	Away	Aggregate
1955–56	European Cup	R1	(Spain) Real Madrid	0–2	0–5	0–7
1961–62	European Cup	PR	(Malta) Hibernians	5–0	2–1	7–1
1961–62	European Cup	R1	(Czechoslovakia) Dukla Prague	4–3	0–2	4–5
1962–63	European Cup	PR	(Netherlands) Feyenoord	1–3	3–1	4–4 (Note: Feyenoord beat Servette 3–1 after extra time in a play–off in neutral ground to qualify for the first round.)
1963–64	Inter-Cities Fairs Cup	R1	(Czechoslovakia) Spartak Brno	1–2	0–5	1–7
1964–65	Inter-Cities Fairs Cup	R1	(Spain) Atlético Madrid	2–2	1–6	3–8
1965–66	Inter-Cities Fairs Cup	R2	(Sweden) AIK	4–1	1–2	5–3
1965–66	Inter-Cities Fairs Cup	R3	(West Germany) 1860 Munich	1–1	1–4	2–5
1966–67	European Cup Winners' Cup	R1	(Finland) Åbo IFK	1–1	2–1	3–2
1966–67	European Cup Winners' Cup	R2	(Netherlands) Sparta Rotterdam	2–0	0–1	2–1
1966–67	European Cup Winners' Cup	Quarter-finals	(Bulgaria) Slavia Sofia	1–0	0–3	1–3
1967–68	Inter-Cities Fairs Cup	R1	(West Germany) 1860 Munich	2–2	0–4	2–6
1971–72	European Cup Winners' Cup	R1	(England) Liverpool	2–1	0–2	2–3
1974–75	UEFA Cup	R1	(England) Derby County	1–2	1–4	2–6
1976–77	European Cup Winners' Cup	PR	(Wales) Cardiff City	2–1	0–1	2–2 (a)
1977–78	UEFA Cup	R1	(Spain) Athletic Bilbao	1–0	0–2	1–2
1978–79	European Cup Winners' Cup	R1	(Greece) PAOK	4–0	0–2	4–2
1978–79	European Cup Winners' Cup	R2	(France) Nancy	2–1	2–2	4–3
1978–79	European Cup Winners' Cup	Quarter-finals	(West Germany) Fortuna Düsseldorf	1–1	0–0	1–1 (a)
1979–80	European Cup	R1	(Belgium) Beveren	3–1	1–1	4–2
1979–80	European Cup	R2	(East Germany) BFC Dynamo	2–2	1–2	3–4
1980–81	UEFA Cup	R1	(France) Sochaux	2–1	0–2	2–3
1982–83	UEFA Cup	R1	(Luxembourg) Progrès Niedercorn	3–0	1–0	4–0
1982–83	UEFA Cup	R2	(Poland) Śląsk Wrocław	5–1	2–0	7–1
1982–83	UEFA Cup	R3	(Czechoslovakia) Bohemians	2–2	1–2	3–4
1983–84	European Cup Winners' Cup	R1	(Luxembourg) Avenir Beggen	4–0	5–1	9–1
1983–84	European Cup Winners' Cup	R2	(Soviet Union) Shakhtar Donetsk	1–2	0–1	1–3
1984–85	European Cup Winners' Cup	R1	(Cyprus) APOEL	3–1	3–0	6–1
1984–85	European Cup Winners' Cup	R2	(Greece) AEL	0–1	1–2	1–3
1985–86	European Cup	R1	(Northern Ireland) Linfield	2–1	2–2	4–3
1985–86	European Cup	R2	(Scotland) Aberdeen	0–0	0–1	0–1
1988–89	UEFA Cup	R1	(Austria) Sturm Graz	1–0	0–0	1–0
1988–89	UEFA Cup	R2	(Netherlands) Groningen	1–1	0–2	1–3
1993–94	UEFA Cup	R1	(Northern Ireland) Crusaders	4–0	0–0	4–0
1993–94	UEFA Cup	R2	(France) Bordeaux	0–1	1–2	1–3
1994–95	UEFA Champions League	PR	(Romania) Steaua București	1–1	1–4	2–5
1998–99	UEFA Cup	QR2	(Belgium) KFC Germinal Ekeren	1–2	4–1	5–3
1998–99	UEFA Cup	R1	(Bulgaria) CSKA Sofia	2–1	0–1	2–2 (a)
1999–2000	UEFA Champions League	QR3	(Austria) Sturm Graz	2–2	1–2	3–4
1999–2000	UEFA Cup	R1	(Greece) Aris	1–2 (a.e.t.)	1–1	2–3
2001–02	UEFA Cup	R1	(Czech Republic) Slavia Prague	1–0	1–1	2–1
2001–02	UEFA Cup	R2	(Spain) Zaragoza	1–0	0–0	1–0
2001–02	UEFA Cup	R3	(Germany) Hertha BSC	0–0	3–0	3–0
2001–02	UEFA Cup	R4	(Spain) Valencia	2–2	0–3	2–5
2002–03	UEFA Cup	PR	(Armenia) Spartak Yerevan	3–0	2–0	5–0
2002–03	UEFA Cup	R1	(Poland) Amica Wronki	2–3	2–1	4–4 (a)
2004–05	UEFA Cup	QR2	(Hungary) Újpest	0–2	1–3	1–5
2012–13	UEFA Europa League	QR2	(Armenia) Gandzasar	2–0	3–1	5–1
2012–13	UEFA Europa League	QR3	(Norway) Rosenborg	1–1	0–0	1–1 (a)
2020–21	UEFA Europa League	QR1	(Slovakia) Ružomberok	3–0	–	3–0 (Note: Due to the COVID-19 pandemic in Europe, all qualifying matches, including the play-off round, were played as single leg matches, hosted by one of the teams decided by draw.)
2020–21	UEFA Europa League	QR2	(France) Reims	0–1	–	0–1
2021–22	UEFA Europa Conference League	QR2	(Norway) Molde	2–0	0–3	2–3
2023–24	UEFA Champions League	QR2	(Belgium) Genk	1–1	2–2 (a.e.t.)	3–3 (4–1 p)
2023–24	UEFA Champions League	QR3	(Scotland) Rangers	1–1	1–2	2–3
2023–24	UEFA Europa League	GS	(Italy) Roma	1–1	0−4	3rd
2023–24	UEFA Europa League	GS	(Czech Republic) Slavia Prague	0−2	0−4	3rd
2023–24	UEFA Europa League	GS	(Moldova) Sheriff Tiraspol	2–1	1–1	3rd
2023–24	UEFA Europa Conference League	KPO	(Bulgaria) Ludogorets Razgrad	0–0	1–0	1–0
2023–24	UEFA Europa Conference League	R16	(Czech Republic) Viktoria Plzeň	0–0	0–0 (a.e.t.)	0–0 (1–3 p)
2024–25	UEFA Europa League	QR3	(Portugal) Braga	1−2	0–0	1–2
2024–25	UEFA Conference League	PO	(England) Chelsea	2–1	0−2	2−3
2025–26	UEFA Champions League	QR2	(Czech Republic) Viktoria Plzeň	1−3	1–0	2−3
2025–26	UEFA Europa League	QR3	(Netherlands) Utrecht	1−3	1−2	2−5
2025–26	UEFA Conference League	PO	(Ukraine) Shakhtar Donetsk	1−2 (a.e.t.)	1–1	2−3

=== UEFA coefficient ===
Correct as of 21 May 2025.

Rank	Team	Points
137	(Russia) Spartak Moscow	12.000
138	(Scotland) Heart of Midlothian	11.500
139	(Switzerland) Servette	11.500
140	(Estonia) Flora	11.500
141	(Belgium) Genk	11.370

== Managers ==
- (England) Teddy Duckworth (1919–29)
- (England) Frido Barth (1929)
- (England) Teddy Duckworth (1930)
- (Austria) Karl Rappan (1932–35)
- (Hungary) Leo Weisz (1935–36)
- (Switzerland) R. Pache / (Switzerland) A. Guinchard (1936–37)
- (Austria) Otto Höss (1937)
- (Switzerland) André Abegglen (1937–42)
- (Switzerland) Léo Wionsowski (1942–43)
- (Switzerland) Fernand Jaccard (1943–48)
- (Austria) Karl Rappan (1948–53)
- (Switzerland) Albert Châtelain (1953–54)
- (Austria) K. Rappan / (Switzerland) A. Châtelain (1954–55)
- (Austria) K. Rappan / (Austria) T. Brinek (1955–56)
- (Austria) Karl Rappan (1956–57)
- (Hungary) Jenő Vincze (1957–58)
- (Switzerland) Frank Séchehaye (1958–59)
- (France) Jean Snella (1959–63)
- (France) Lucien Leduc (1963–66)
- (Switzerland) Roger Vonlanthen (1966)
- (Hungary) (Austria) Béla Guttmann (1966–67)
- (Switzerland) Gilbert Dutoît (1967)
- (France) Jean Snella (1967–71)
- (Switzerland) Henri Gillet (1971–72)
- (Germany) Jürgen Sundermann (1972–76)
- (Hungary) Péter Pázmándy (1976–82)
- (Switzerland) Guy Mathez (1982–85)
- (France) Jean-Marc Guillou (1985–86)
- (Switzerland) Thierry De Choudens (1986–88)
- (Switzerland) Jean-Claude Donzé (1988–89)
- (Hungary) Péter Pázmándy (1989–90)
- (Netherlands) Ruud Krol (March 1990 – June 90)
- (France) Gilbert Gress (July 1990 – June 91)
- (Belgium) Jean Thissen (1991)
- (Switzerland) B. Mocellin / J. Barlie / (Switzerland) H. Hermann (1991)
- (Belgium) Michel Renquin (July 1991 – March 93)
- (Federal Republic of Yugoslavia) Ilija Petković (March 1993 – March 95)
- (Switzerland) Bernard Challandes (March 1995 – October 95)
- (Switzerland) Umberto Barberis (October 1995 – May 96)
- (Federal Republic of Yugoslavia) Vujadin Boškov (July 1996 – December 96)
- (Switzerland) Guy Mathez (1997)
- (Switzerland) Gérard Castella (July 1997 – October 99)
- (North Macedonia) Boško Đurovski (1999)
- (France) René Exbrayat (1999–00)
- (Switzerland) Lucien Favre (July 2000 – June 2002)
- (Switzerland) Roberto Morinini (July 2002 – 3 March 03)
- (Romania) Adrian Ursea (interim) (March 2003 – 3 June 04)
- (Switzerland) Marco Schällibaum (July 2003 – 4 Aug 04)
- (Romania) A. Ursea / (Switzerland) (Italy) S. Ceccaroni (interim) (August 2004 – 4 Oct 04)
- (Switzerland) Diego Sessolo (2004–05)
- (Switzerland) Jean-Michel Aeby (July 2006 – 8 May 08)
- (Switzerland) Michel Sauthier (July 2008 – 8 Sep 08)
- (Switzerland) Gérard Castella (September 2008 – 9 April 09)
- (Switzerland) William Niederhauser (April 2009 – 9 Oct 09)
- (Portugal) João Alves (October 2009 – 11 Nov 11)
- (Portugal) João Pereira (November 2011 – 12 April 12)
- (Portugal) João Alves (April 2012 – 12 Sep 12)
- (Switzerland) Sébastien Fournier (September 2012 – July 2013)
- (Switzerland) Jean-Michel Aeby (August 2013 – 14 April 2014)
- (Switzerland) Mario Cantaluppi (April 2014 – 14 Jun 14)
- (England) Kevin Cooper (July 2014 – 15 Nov 15)
- (Switzerland) William Niederhauser / (Switzerland) Thierry Cotting (15 Nov 2015 – 16 Jan 16)
- (France) Anthony Braizat (16 Jan 2016 – 16 Dec)
- (Bosnia and Herzegovina) Meho Kodro (Dec 2016 – 18 Mar)
- (Switzerland) Alain Geiger (May 2018 – 23 May)
- (Switzerland) René Weiler (June 2023 – June 2024)
- (Switzerland) Thomas Häberli (June 2024 – 4 August 2025)
- (France) Jocelyn Gourvennec (11 August 2025 – present)
