= Stadion Rankhof =

Football stadium in Basel, Switzerland

Rankhof
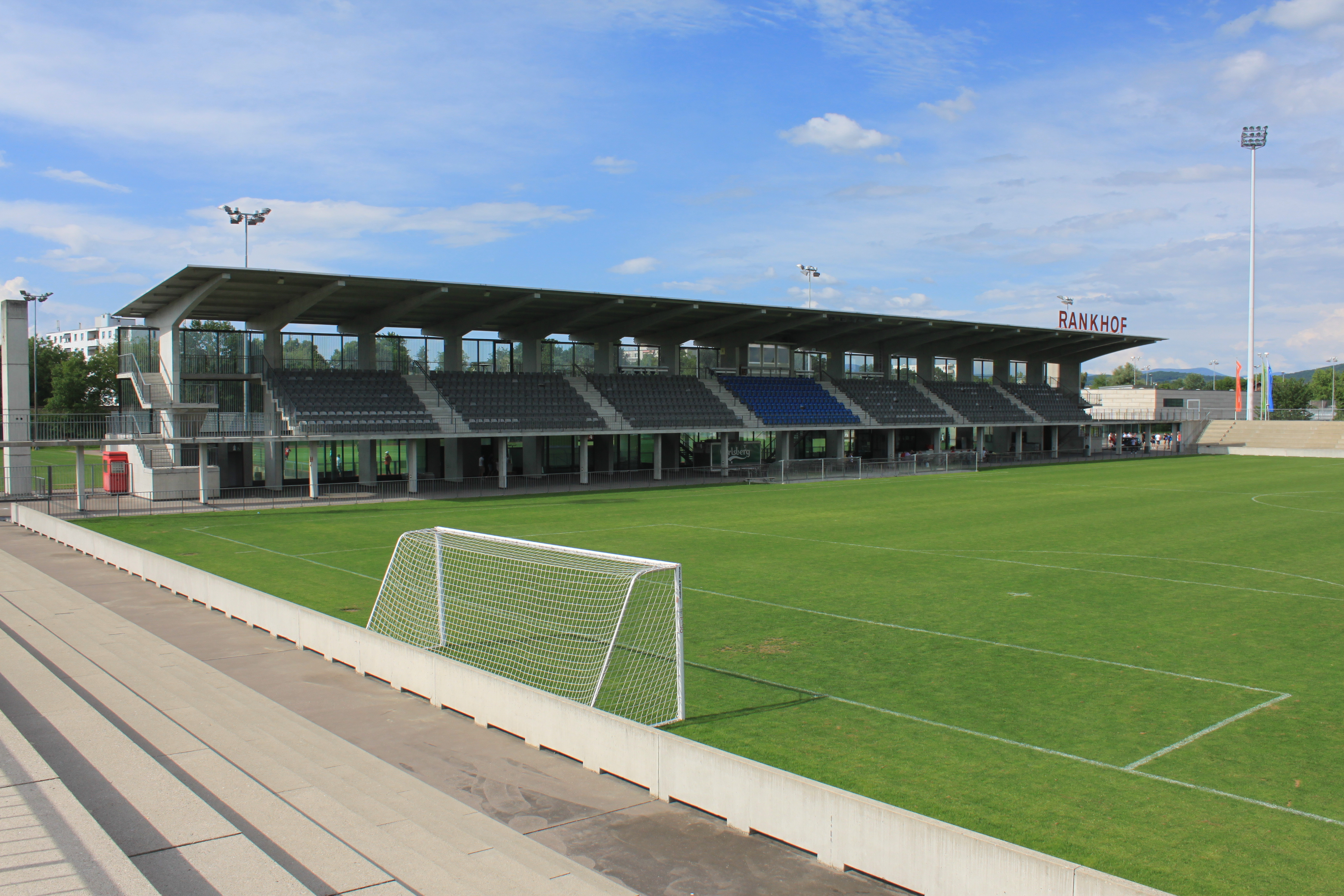
- Interactive map of Rankhof
- Location: Basel, Switzerland
- Coordinates: 47.561194°N 7.620014°E
- Capacity: 7,600
- Surface: Grass
- Field size: 100x64m

Construction
- Renovated: 1993-1995

Tenants
- FC Nordstern Basel, FC Basel U-21, Basel Gladiators American football club

Stadion Rankhof is a football stadium in Basel, Switzerland. It has a capacity of 7,600 with 1,000 seats and 6,600 standing places. The record attendance of the original stadium was about 30,000 spectators. The stadium was rebuilt between 1993 and 1995. The stands face south towards the grass pitch. The north side of the stadium is completely constructed of glass to protect against the wind. The dimension of the pitch is 100 x 64 metres. It has a grass surface and flood-lighting. The second pitch, north of the stands, is the same size and also has flood-lighting. Rankhof has four training and one synthetic pitch, this also has flood-lights. Further there is a gymnasium and six tennis courts.

Rankhof is the home ground for FC Nordstern Basel, FC Basel U-21, and the Basel Gladiators American football club. Until the end the 2008/09 season it was also the home of FC Concordia Basel.

== See also ==
- List of football stadiums in Switzerland
