= FC Nordstern Basel =

Swiss football club

- Full name: Football Club Nordstern Basel 1901
- Founded: 1901
- Ground: Rankhof
- Capacity: 7,600
- Coach: Andy Wyss
- League: 4. liga

FC Nordstern Basel is a football team from Basel, Switzerland. Currently playing in the Swiss 8th division, FC Nordstern Basel has spent 35 seasons in the Swiss top flight, last in 1982. They were runners-up in the Swiss league in 1924, 1927, and 1928.

== History ==
Nordstern Basel was founded in 1901.

In the 1970s, the club experienced a revival after hiring player-coach Zvezdan Cebinac. Cebinac led Nordstern back to the Nationalliga A for the first time since the 1940s.

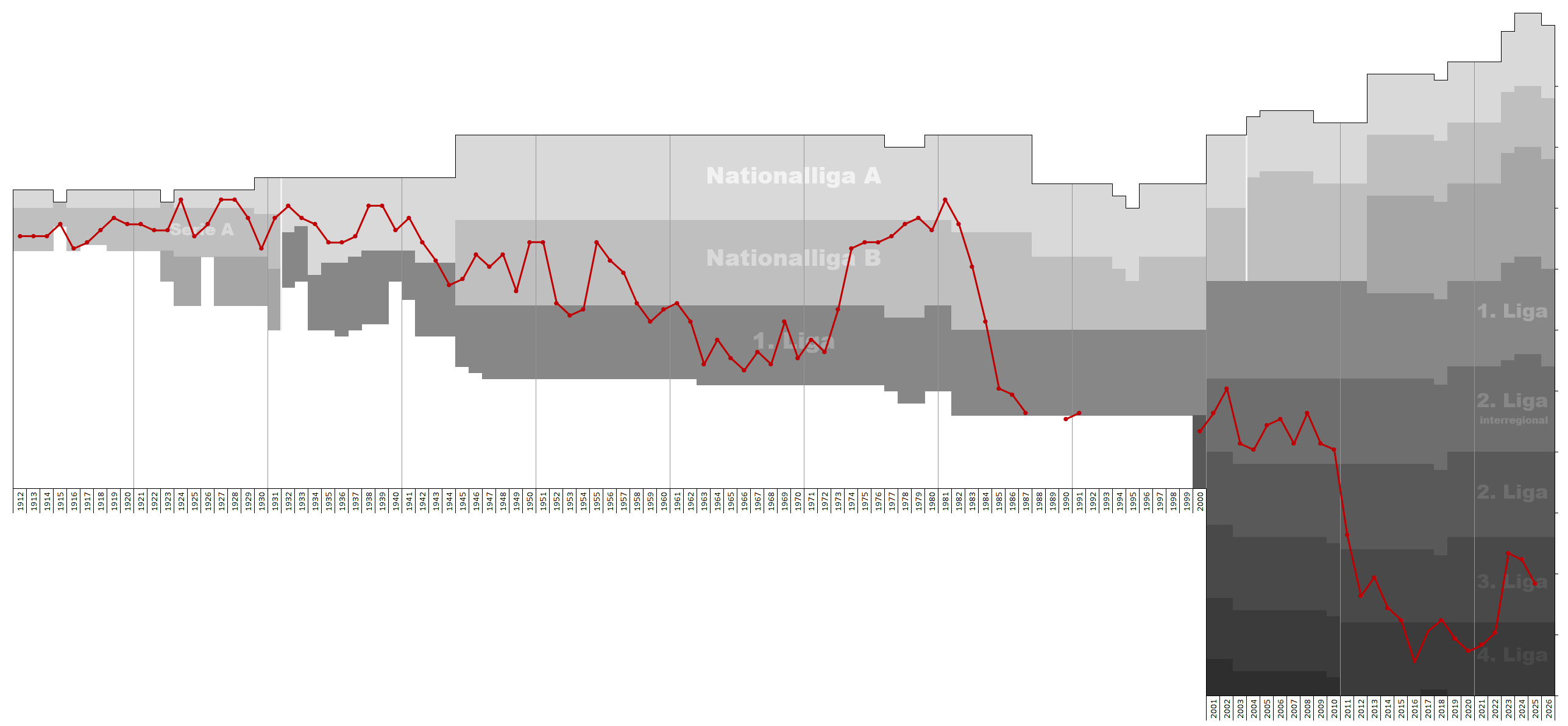
Chart of FC Nordstern Basel table positions in the Swiss football league system

== Honours ==
- Swiss Cup
  - Runners-up (2): 1934–35, 1938–39
