= 1930–31 Swiss Cup =

Tournament details
- Country: Switzerland
- Teams: 135

Final positions
- Champions: Lugano
- Runners-up: Grasshopper Club

The 1930–31 Swiss Cup was the 6th edition of Switzerland's football cup competition, organised annually since the 1925–26 season by the Swiss Football Association.

== Overview ==
=== Preamble ===
In Switzerland, after the end of the first world war, the 1920s saw a rapid rise in the popularity of top-level football and also a decade of rapid growth in grassroots football and many new football clubs were formed. By the mid-1920s, every larger Swiss town had a football pitch and its own football club. Top level organised football also experienced a boom and the larger already existing clubs were also expanding and growing. Between 1922 and 1930, twelve new football stadiums were built, each with a capacity of over 10,000 spectators. Furthermore, semi- and fully professional football players began to emerge and transfer fees started to become a reality.

The structure of the Swiss championships provided a top-tier Serie A with 27 teams (3 regional groups of 9 clubs) and a second-tier Promotion Series with 54 teams divided into 6 groups. From the third-tier the football system was arranged in the regional leagues, named Serie B, C and D. However, the Swiss league system was suffering a crisis and the differences had expand during the previous few years. There were continuous disagreements between smaller and larger clubs, mainly concerning promotion/relegation procedures, which included play-offs between lower-tier group winners and upper-tier group losers. Things came to a peak at exactly this time, due to the fact that at the end of the previous season there were no promotion/relegation play-offs between the top two tiers. At last years' AGM the Swiss Football and Athletics Federation (SFAV), as the Swiss Football Association used to call itself, then decided to reorganise the structures of their championships and that the first, second and third tiers would be re-arranged. The new league would start explicitly in the following season and his season remained as transition season.

=== Format ===
The Cup competition that had been introduced five years earlier, to relieve these rising differences, proved to be a success. This season 135 clubs applied to join the cup competition and, therefore, it began with two preliminary rounds, before the main competition began. The first qualifying round was played at the end of August and second qualifying at the beginning of September 1930. The first principal round was played at the beginning of October. The competition was to be completed on Sunday 10 May 1931, with the final, which this year was held at the Campo Marzio in Lugano.

The preliminary rounds were held for the lower league teams that were not qualified for the main rounds. Reserve teams were not admitted to the competition. The 27 clubs from this season's top-tier, in the 1930–31 Swiss Serie A, joined the competition in the first principal round, which was played on Saturday and Sunday, 4 and 5 October.

The matches were played in a knockout format. In the event of a draw after 90 minutes, the match went into extra time. In the event of a draw at the end of extra time, if agreed between the clubs, a second extra time was played. If the score was still level at the final whistle, a replay was foreseen and this was played on the visiting team's pitch. If no replay was agreed or the replay ended in a draw after extra time, a toss of a coin would establish the team that qualified for the next round.

== Preliminary rounds ==
The lower league teams that had not qualified for the competition competed here in two preliminary knockout rounds. Reserve teams were not admitted to the competition. The aim of this preliminary stage was to reduce the number of lower league teams to 31 before the first main round, to join the 33 clubs from the top-tier that were automatically qualified. The draw in the preliminary stage and in the early rounds of the main competition respected local regionalities. Both preliminary rounds were played in advance of the lower leagues regional season.

=== First preliminary round ===
Team 1	Score	Team 2
24 August 1930
FC Madretsch (Biel)	5–1	FC Saint-Jean Genève
Baden	1–2	FC Liestal
SV Schaffhausen	2–3	FC Industrie
31 August 1930
FC Bözingen	2–1	FC Länggasse (Bern)
FC Lengnau	4–3	FC Helvetia Bern
Cercle des Sports Bienne	1–2	FC Nidau
FC Birsfelden	4–2	Red Star
FC Wädenswil	0–2	FC Amriswil
FC Münchenstein	4–2	SC Veltheim (Winterthur)
FC Flawil	5–6 (a.e.t.)	FC Buchs (SG)
FC Helvetia Bern	0–2	FC Breite (Basel)
FC Lenzburg	5–2	FC Romanshorn
FC Dietikon	3–4	FC Langnau am Albis (ZH)
FC Töss (Winterthur)	3–2	VfR Kleinhüningen
SV Höngg	2–5	SV Sissach
Sirius Zürich	2–4	Kickers Luzern
FC Weinfelden	1–5	SV Seebach
Black Stars	5–3	Fortuna Oberstrass
Sportfreunde Basel	0–6	FC Buchs (AG)
Frauenfeld	3–6	FC Oerlikon (ZH)
FC Allschwil	4–3	Arbon
SC Zug	3–7	FC Engstringen
Uster	6–1	FC Neuhausen
Rasenspiele Basel	2–1 (a.e.t.)	FC Altstetten (Zürich)
FC Horgen	1–7	FC Diana Zürich
Sparta Schaffhausen	3–2 (a.e.t.)	Juventus Zürich
Wohlen	1–4	Luzern
Locarno	5–0	FC Adliswil
FC Thalwil	3–5 (a.e.t.)	GC Luganesi
SV Suhr	1–3	SC Balerna
Bellinzona	3–2	Bülach
Couvet-Sports	4–2	Richemond-Daillettes (FR)
FC Gloria (Le Locle)	FF; Awd 3–0 *	Payerne-Sports
FC Le Locle	1–5 annulled Awd 0–3 *	USI Dopolavoro Genève
Vevey Sports	3–0	SCI Esperia Bern
La Côte-Sports Rolle	4–6	ASEP Saint-Imier-Sports
CAA Genève	7–2 annulled Awd 0–3 *	FC Boudry
Stade Nyonnais	3–1	FC Tramelan
Sion	4–3	FC Tavannes
Sport Boys Bern	2–1	Montreux-Sports
CS La Tour-de-Peilz	2–3	US Fulgor Grenchen
FC Chailly/Lausanne	3–2	Martigny-Sports
Concordia Yverdon	8–1	FC Reconvilier
FC Fleurier	3–4	FC Xamax (Neuchâtel)
Sylva-Sports (Le Locle)	3–1 annulled Awd 0–3 *	Zähringia Bern
FC Viktoria Bern	1–2	Monthey
Minerva Bern	3–2	FC Yverdon
Villeneuve-Sports	1–4	Central Fribourg
Sainte-Croix Sports	2–3	FC Renens
FC Jonction (Genève)	7–0	Olympia-Sports Vevey
Racing-Club Lausanne	0–1 annulled Awd 3–0 *	Stade Lausanne
Thun	2–1	Delémont
FC Forward Morges	4–1	FC Lancy-Champagne-Sports
FC Olten	4–2	Chênois

- Note to match Couvet-Sports–Richemond-Daillettes: Richemond-Daillettes declaired forfeit and the match was awarded as a 3–0 victory for Couvet-Sports.
- Note to match Le Locle–Dopolavoro: a player of FC Le Locle was not qualified, the result was annulled and the match was awarded as a 3–0 victory for Dopolavoro.
- Note to match CAA Genève–Boudry: a player of CAA Genève was not qualified, the result was annulled and the match was awarded as a 3–0 victory for Boudry.
- Note to match Sylva-Sports–Zähringia: following a protest from Zähringia, the result was annulled and awarded as a 3–0 victory for Zähringia.
- Note to match Racing-Club–Stade Lausanne: a player of Stade Lausanne was not qualified, the result was annulled and the match was awarded as a 3–0 victory for Racing-Club.

=== Second preliminary round ===
Team 1	Score	Team 2
7 September 1930
FC Lenzburg	1–7	FC Töss (Winterthur)
Locarno	2–1 (a.e.t.)	Sparta Schaffhausen
FC Amriswil	1–2	FC Breite (Basel)
FC Birsfelden	1–2	SV Seebach
Black Stars	1–0 (a.e.t.)	FC Diana Zürich
SC Balerna	2–4 (a.e.t.)	Kickers Luzern
FC Oerlikon (ZH)	9–1	SV Sissach
Rasenspiele Basel	3–4	FC Langnau am Albis (ZH)
FC Liestal	2–1	FC Münchenstein
FC Lengnau	2–3	Monthey
FC Bözingen	4–2	Couvet-Sports
FC Chailly/Lausanne	0–6	Central Fribourg
FC Gloria (Le Locle)	0–12	FC Olten
Vevey Sports	FF; Awd 3–0 *	ASEP Saint-Imier-Sports
FC Forward Morges	3–2	FC Madretsch (Biel)
21 September 1930
FC Jonction (Genève)	5–0	FC Renens
Stade Nyonnais	6–2	Sion

- Note to match Vevey Sports–ASEP Saint-Imier-Sports: Saint-Imier declaired forfeit and the match was awarded as a 3–0 victory for Vevey Sports.
- All the other clubs received byes.

== First principal round ==
The winners of the qualification round were to join the clubs from the lower leagues that had already qualified and the teams from the top-tier that were automatically qualified. The draw in the early rounds of the main competition respected local regionalities, whenever possible.

=== Summary ===
Team 1	Score	Team 2
4 October 1930
Servette	2–1	FC Xamax (Neuchâtel)
5 October 1930
Bellinzona	1–5	Luzern
Zürich	6–0	Black Stars
FC Liestal	8–4	FC Engstringen
FC Buchs SG	3–7 (a.e.t.)	St. Gallen
Concordia Basel	4–3	SV Seebach
Old Boys	1–2	Winterthur
Basel	4–5	Locarno
Lugano	6–3	Chiasso
FC Langnau am Albis (ZH)	2–5	FC Oerlikon (ZH)
FC Breite (Basel)	4–3	Uster
Brühl	5–0	FC Allschwil
Solothurn	5–2	Minerva Bern
Fulgor Grenchen	1–4	Cantonal Neuchâtel
FC Boudry	1–12	FC Olten
Lausanne-Sport	3–1	FC Nidau
Sion	4–0	Central Fribourg
Vevey Sports	0–6	Grenchen
La Chaux-de-Fonds	2–1	Young Boys
FC Bözingen	3–1	Zähringia Bern
FC Jonction (Genève)	2–5	Etoile Carouge
Urania Genève Sport	3–1	Biel-Bienne
Sport-Boys Bern	2–4	Racing-Club Lausanne
Bern	3–1	Étoile-Sporting
FC Forward Morges	2–1	Concordia Yverdon
Kickers Luzern	1–5	Young Fellows
FC Töss (Winterthur)	1–5	Grasshopper Club
USI Dopolavoro Genève	2–4	Fribourg
Monthey	3–3 (a.e.t.); Awd 0–3 *	Thun
Aarau	1–2	Blue Stars
GC Luganesi	3–2	FC Industrie (Zürich)
12 October 1930
FC Buchs (AG)	1–9	Nordstern

- Note to match Monthey–Thun: The match was abandoned due to darkness and awarded as a 3–0 victory for Thun who qualified for next round.

=== Matches ===
4 October 1930

Servette	2–1	FC Xamax (Neuchâtel)
Edward Brown; Bailly	Servette summary	Goal

Stade des Charmilles, Geneva
- Servette played the 1930/31 season in the Serie A (top-tier), Xamax in the Serie C (fourth tier).

5 October 1930

Zürich	6–0	Black Stars
Max Meier 5' (1:0); Max Meier 59' (2:0); Baumeister 64' (3:0); Max Meier (4:0); Baumeister (5:0); Baumeister 74' (6:0)	FCZ summary

Letzigrund, Zürich
Attendance: 500
Referee: (Switzerland) Hans Enderli (Winterthur)
- Zürich played the 1930/31 season in the Serie A (top-tier)
- Black Stars played the first half of the 1930/31 season in the second-tier and the second half of the season in the top-tier.

5 October 1930
14:30

Basel	4–5 (Note: Extra time 2x 30 Minutes. Score after 90 minutes 2:2, after 120 minutes 4:4) (a.e.t.)	Locarno
Kielholz 11' (1:1); Wionsowsky (2:1); Wionsowsky 94' (3:2); Bielser 110' (4:2)	FCB summary	5' (0:1) Case (II); 60' (2:2) Spehler; 111' (4:3) Mutter; 120' (4:4) Case (II); 150' (4:5) Carminati

Landhof, Basel
Attendance: 3,500
Referee: (Switzerland) Albert Osterwalder (Bern)

Notes

- Basel played the 1930/31 season in the Serie A (top-tier)
- Locarno played the first half of the 1930/31 season in the second-tier and the second half of the season in the top-tier.

5 October 1930

Aarau	1–2	Blue Stars
Goal	FCA summary	Goal

Stadion Brügglifeld, Aarau
- Both Aarau and Blue Stars played the 1930/31 season in the Serie A (top-tier).

== Round 2 ==
=== Sumarry ===
Team 1	Score	Team 2
2 November 1930
Blue Stars	9–0	GC Luganesi
9 November 1930
Nordstern	2–1	Luzern
Zürich	2–1	FC Liestal
St. Gallen	3–0	Concordia Basel
Winterthur	1–0	Locarno
Lugano	11–1	FC Oerlikon (ZH)
FC Breite (Basel)	2–6	Brühl
Solothurn	2–3	Cantonal Neuchâtel
FC Olten	2–1	Lausanne-Sport
Sion	0–3	Grenchen
La Chaux-de-Fonds	7–1	FC Bözingen
Etoile Carouge	1–5	Urania Genève Sport
Racing-Club Lausanne	2–1	Servette
Bern	2–0	FC Forward Morges
Young Fellows	0–4	Grasshopper Club
Fribourg	6–3	Thun

=== Matches ===
9 November 1930
13:00

Zürich	2–1	FC Liestal
Meyer 75' (1:1); A. Lehmann 90' (2:1)	FCZ summary	41' (0:1) Schaub

Hardturm, Zürich
Attendance: 3,000
Referee: (Switzerland) Meyer
- Zürich played the 1930/31 season in the Serie A (top-tier), Liestal in the Serie B (third tier).

9 November 1930

Racing-Club Lausanne	2–1	Servette
Goal	Servette summary	Tschirren

Centre sportif de la Tuilière, Lausanne
- Racing-Club played the first half of the 1930/31 season in the second-tier and the second half in the top-tier.
- Servette in the top-tier.

== Round 3 ==
=== Summary ===
Team 1	Score	Team 2
7 December 1930
Winterthur	1–3	Nordstern
Bern	0–2	La Chaux-de-Fonds
Lugano	2–0	Zürich
Grasshopper Club	4–1	Brühl
St. Gallen	1–4	Blue Stars
Racing-Club Lausanne	0–1	Grenchen
Cantonal Neuchâtel	3–1	FC Olten
14 December 1930
Urania Genève Sport	6–0	Fribourg

=== Matches ===
7 December 1930

Winterthur	1–3	Nordstern
Bösch	RSSSF summary	Büche; Hediger; Hediger

Schützenwiese, Winterthur
- Both Winterthur and Nordstern played the 1930/31 season in the Serie A (top-tier).

7 December 1930

Bern	0–2	La Chaux-de-Fonds
	RSSSF summary	65' (0:1) Grimm; 75' (0:2) Grimm

Stadion Neufeld, Bern
- Both Bern and La Chaux-de-Fonds played the 1930/31 season in the Serie A (top-tier).

7 December 1930

Lugano	2–0	Zürich
Cabrini 50' (1:0); Fink 80' (2:0)	FCZ summary

Campo Marzio, Lugano
Attendance: 3,000
Referee: (Switzerland) Menke (Schlieren)
- Both Lugano and Zürich played the 1930/31 season in the Serie A (top-tier).

7 December 1930

Grasshopper Club	4–1	Brühl
Adam; Grassi; Grassi; Max Abegglen	RSSSF summary	60' Steinwalder

Hardturm, Zürich
- Both GC and Brühl played the 1930/31 season in the Serie A (top-tier).

7 December 1930

St. Gallen	1–4	Blue Stars
Volery (pen.)	RSSSF summary	Springer; Springer; Springer; Rey

Espenmoos, St. Gallen
- Both St. Gallen and Blue Stars played the 1930/31 season in the Serie A (top-tier).

7 December 1930

Racing-Club Lausanne	0–1	Grenchen
	RSSSF summary	85' (0:1) Schreiber

Centre sportif de la Tuilière, Lausanne
- Racing-Club played the first half of the 1930/31 season in the second-tier and the second half in the top-tier.
- Grenchen in the top-tier.

7 December 1930

Cantonal Neuchâtel	3–1	FC Olten
Bossi 50' (pen.); Siems (2:1); Presch (3:1)	RSSSF summary	4' (0:1) Korber

- Cantonal played the 1930/31 season in the Serie A (top-tier), Olten in the Serie Promotion (second tier)

14 December 1930

Urania Genève Sport	6–0	Fribourg
Kramer 5' (1:0); Stalder 70' (2:0); Sekoulitch 75' (3:0); Stalder 81' (4:0); Sekoulitch 87' (5:0); Sekoulitch 90' (6:0)	RSSSF summary

Stade de Frontenex, Genève
- Both UGS and Fribourg played the 1930/31 season in the Serie A (top-tier).

== Quarter-finals ==
=== Summary ===
Team 1	Score	Team 2
28 December 1930
La Chaux-de-Fonds	3–1	Nordstern
1 February 1931
Grasshopper Club	7–2	Blue Stars
Grenchen	1–4	Lugano
Urania Genève Sport	8–0	Cantonal Neuchâtel

=== Matches ===
28 December 1930

La Chaux-de-Fonds	3–1	Nordstern
Ducommun 30' (1:0); Jäggi IV 66' (2:1); Grimm 76' (3:1)	RSSSF summary	35' (1:1) Bucco

Parc des Sports la Charrière, La Chaux-de-Fonds

1 February 1931

Grasshopper Club	7–2	Blue Stars
3x Max Abegglen; 2x Adam; 2x A. Abegglen	RSSSF summary	2x Springer

Hardturm, Zürich

1 February 1931

Grenchen	1–4	Lugano
Dubois 15' (1:1)	RSSSF summary	10' (0:1) Sturzenegger; 25' (1:2) Cabrini; 63' (1:3) Fink; 75' (1:4) Costa]

Stadium Brühl, Grenchen

1 February 1931

Urania Genève Sport	8–0	Cantonal Neuchâtel
3x Zila; 3x Stalder; 2x Syrvet	RSSSF summary

Stade de Frontenex, Genève

== Semi-finals ==
=== Summary ===
Team 1	Score	Team 2
1 March 1931
Lugano	3–1	Urania Genève Sport
19 April 1931
Grasshopper Club	2–1	La Chaux-de-Fonds

=== Matches ===
1 March 1931

Lugano	3–1	Urania Genève Sport
Fink 18' (1:0); Sturzenegger 38' (2:0); Sturzenegger 40' (3:0)	RSSSF summary	42' (3:1) Stalder

Campo Marzio, Lugano
Attendance: 3,500
Referee: (Switzerland) Albert Osterwalder (Bern)

19 April 1931

Grasshopper Club	2–1	La Chaux-de-Fonds
Faugel 1' (1:0); Faugel 5' (2:0)	RSSSF summary	86' (2:1) Ducommun

Hardturm Sportplatz, Zürich
Attendance: 15,000
Referee: (Switzerland) Anton Giavarini (Basel)

== Final ==
The final was held on Sunday 10 May 1931. The location for the final was decided by a toss of a coin between the two finalists. Lugano won the draw and so the final was held at the former Campo Marzio in Lugano.

=== Summary ===
Team 1	Score	Team 2
10 May 1931
Lugano	2–1 (a.e.t.)	Grasshopper Club

=== Telegram ===
10 May 1931

Lugano	2–1 (a.e.t.)	Grasshopper Club
Sturzenegger 73' (pen 1:1); Poretti 118' (2:1)	Fussball-Schweiz summary	64' (0:1) Steiner

Campo Marzio, Lugano
Attendance: 6,000
Referee: (Switzerland) Walter Jordan (Basel)

Lugano won the cup and this was the club's first cup title to this date.

== Further in Swiss football ==
- 1930–31 Swiss Serie A
- 1930–31 FC Basel season

== Sources ==
- Fussball-Schweiz
- Switzerland 1930–31 at RSSSF

Preceded by 1929–30	Swiss Cup seasons	Succeeded by 1931–32
