= 1931–32 Swiss Cup =

Tournament details
- Country: Switzerland

Final positions
- Champions: Grasshopper Club
- Runners-up: Urania Genève Sport

The 1931–32 Swiss Cup was the 7th edition of Switzerland's football cup competition, organised annually since the 1925–26 season by the Swiss Football Association.

== Overview ==
=== Preamble ===
At this time, within the Swiss football scene, a major crisis had occurred which had to be resolved. After the first world war, many new clubs had been founded, especially during the 1920s, and these were trying to join the existing clubs in the national rankings. Then, in the late 1920s, major disagreements arose between the smaller and larger clubs, mainly revolving around the relegation and promotion procedures to the top and second divisions. The Swiss Football Association (ASF/SFV) resolved the differences by modifying the formats in the football league system. As of this season, the top-tier was renamed to Nationalliga and now had only 18 clubs, which were divided into two groups of nine teams, as opposed to three groups of eleven teams. And as of this season, a new second division had been created. This was now called 1. Liga, also with two groups of nine teams. The former second-tier, which had been 54 teams in six regional groups, called 2. Liga or earlier Serie Promotion, now became the third-tier.

The first and second-tier teams were automatically qualified for the first round of the Swiss Cup and the lower-tier teams had to qualify for their inclusion to the competition.

=== Format ===
This season's cup competition began with two preliminary rounds, before the main competition began. These two preliminary rounds were played during the last week-end of August and first week-end of September 1932. The first principal round was played at the beginning of October. The competition was to be completed on Sunday 3 April 1932, with the final, which that year was held at the Hardturm in Zürich.

The preliminary rounds were held for the lower league teams that were not qualified for the main rounds. Reserve teams were not admitted to the competition. The 18 clubs from this season's reformed 1931–32 Nationalliga and the 18 clubs from this season's newly created 1931–32 Swiss 1. Liga joined the competition in the first principal round, which was played on Sunday 4 October.

The matches were played in a knockout format. In the event of a draw after 90 minutes, the match went into extra time. In the event of a draw at the end of extra time, if agreed between the clubs, a second extra time was played. If the score was still level at the final whistle, a replay was foreseen and this was played on the visiting team's pitch. If no replay was agreed or the replay ended in a draw after extra time, a toss of a coin would establish the team that qualified for the next round.

== Preliminary rounds ==
The lower league teams that had not qualified for the competition competed here in two preliminary knockout rounds. Reserve teams were not admitted to the competition. The aim of this preliminary stage was to reduce the number of lower league teams to 28 before the first main round, to join the 36 clubs from the top two tiers. The draw in the preliminary stage and in the early rounds of the main competition respected local regionalities. Both preliminary rounds were played in advance of the lower leagues regional season.

=== First preliminary round ===
Team 1	Score	Team 2
30 August 1931
Richemond-Daillettes (FR)	0–5	Cercle des Sports Bienne
Delémont	7–2	Sport Boys Bern
FC Tavannes	4–2	Thun
FC Reconvilier	3–2	FC Liestal
White Star (Yverdon)	3–5 (a.e.t.)	Central Fribourg
FC Renens	3–1	CA Genève
Sylva-Sports (Le Locle)	5–1	Couvet-Sports
FC Sierre	5–2	FC Yverdon
Chênois	1–0 (a.e.t.)	Sainte-Croix-Sports
FC Fleurier	6–3	Montreux-Sports
FC Gloria (Le Locle)	4–3	Martigny-Sports
Vevey Sports (t)	4–4 (a.e.t.) *	Villeneuve-Sports
FC Jonction (Genève)	3–2 (a.e.t.)	CS La Tour-de-Peilz
FC Le Locle	5–1	Concordia Yverdon
Star Sécheron (GE)	1–13	FC Forward Morges
FC Boudry	1–3	FC Xamax (Neuchâtel)
FC Chailly/Lausanne	5–1	Olympia-Sports Vevey
Stade Nyonnais	3–1 (a.e.t.)	FC Saint-Jean (GE)
USI Dopolavoro Genève	11–0	Sion
Bellinzona	15–0	Mendrisio
FC Flawil	2–3	SC Balerna
FC Amriswil	0–1	Sparta Schaffhausen

- Note (t): Match Vevey–Villeneuve no replay was agreed between the two teams. Vevey qualified on toss of a coin.

=== Second preliminary round ===
Team 1	Score	Team 2
6 September 1931
FC Gloria (Le Locle)	7–1	FC Chailly/Lausanne
FC Sierre	1–4	FC Forward Morges
USI Dopolavoro Genève	3–5	FC Renens
FC Fleurier	6–3	Sylva-Sports (Le Locle)
Vevey Sports	0–1	FC Xamax (Neuchâtel)
Chênois	2–6	FC Jonction (Genève)
FC Le Locle	5–1	Stade Nyonnais
Bellinzona	5–1	FC Wädenswil
Sparta Schaffhausen	5–1	FC Bülach
FC Balerna	2–1	Juventus Zürich
Kreuzlingen	0–3	Baden
FC Fortuna (SG)	4–2	SC Zug
FC Altstätten (St. Gallen)	3–2	Hakoah Zürich
FC Tössfeld (Winterthur)	0–2	FC Buchs (SG)
FC Birsfelden	1–0	FC Madretsch (Biel)
Lengnau	2–3	FC Bözingen
CS Bienne	1–0	FC Nidau
13 September 1931
FC Viktoria Bern	4–0	Fulgor Grenchen
FC Allschwil	4–1	FC Langenthal

== First principal round ==
The 18 clubs from the 1931–32 Nationalliga and the 18 clubs from 1931–32 1. Liga joined the competition in the first principal round.

=== Summary ===
Team 1	Score	Team 2
4 October 1931
Sparta Schaffhausen	2–1	FC Fortuna (SG)
Grasshopper Club	6–1	Nordstern
Bellinzona	3–0	FC Töss (Winterthur)
St. Gallen	2–3	Concordia Basel
FC Lenzburg	3–2	Black Stars
Kickers Luzern	8–2	FC Altstätten (St. Gallen)
Old Boys	1–0	Luzern
FC Oerlikon (ZH)	0–1	Chiasso
SC Veltheim (Winterthur)	1–5	Basel
FC Birsfelden	0–2	Lugano
Blue Stars	8–4	Locarno
Zürich	9–0	FC Allschwil
Winterthur	3–1	Baden
Young Fellows	10–0	FC Balerna
Brühl	8–0	FC Suhr
Lausanne-Sport	5–3 (a.e.t.)	Grenchen
FC Forward Morges	1–0	Cercle des Sports Bienne
Étoile-Sporting	1–2	La Chaux-de-Fonds
Stade Lausanne	4–1	FC Xamax (Neuchâtel)
FC Olten	7–1	FC Fleurier
FC Viktoria Bern	2–3	Young Boys
Fribourg	2–1	Central Fribourg
FC Tramelan	5–7	Monthey
Racing-Club Lausanne	3–2 (a.e.t.)	Delémont
Biel-Bienne	5–1	Etoile Carouge
FC Le Locle	2–0	FC Reconvilier
FC Jonction (Genève)	1–2	Cantonal Neuchâtel
FC Gloria (Le Locle)	3–0	FC Renens
Urania Genève Sport	2–0	Bern
Solothurn	1–4	Servette
Aarau	4–2	FC Bözingen
11 October 1931
Wohlen	4–2	FC Buchs (SG)

=== Matches ===
4 October 1931

SC Veltheim (Winterthur)	1–5	Basel
Eisenring	FCB summary	(2x) Hiss (1x) Hufschmid (1x) Schlecht (1x) Hummel

Schützenwiese, Winterthur
Attendance: 1,800
Referee: (Switzerland) Hans Bollinger (Schaffhausen)
- Veltheim played the 1931/32 season in the 2. Liga (third tier), Basel in the Nationalliga (top-tier).

4 October 1931

Zürich	9–0	FC Allschwil
Friedmann 2' (1:0); Bösch 15' (2:0); Bösch (3:0); Varga (4:0); Bösch (5:0); Hollenstein (6:0); Hollenstein (7:0); Bösch (8:0); Righetti (9:0)	FCZ summary

Letzigrund, Zürich
Attendance: 800
Referee: (Switzerland) Schrumpf (Zürich)
- Zürich played the 1931/32 season in the Nationalliga (top-tier), Allschwil in the 2. Liga (third tier).

4 October 1931

Solothurn	1–4	Servette
Goal	Servette summary	2x Rier; 2x Tax

Stadion FC Solothurn, Solothurn
- Solothurn played the 1931/32 season in the 1. Liga (second tier), Servette in the Nationalliga (Top-tier)

4 October 1931

Aarau	4–2	FC Bözingen
Goal	FCA summary	Goal

Stadion Brügglifeld, Aarau
- Aarau played the 1931/32 season in the Nationalliga (top-tier), Bözingen in the 3. Liga (fourth tier)

== Round 2 ==
=== Summary ===
Team 1	Score	Team 2
1 November 1931
Sparta Schaffhausen	1–10	Grasshopper Club
Bellinzona	3–0	Concordia Basel
FC Lenzburg	0–9	Kickers Luzern
Old Boys	4–1	Chiasso
Basel	3–3 (a.e.t.)	Lugano
Blue Stars	2–0	Zürich
Winterthur	2–3	Young Fellows
Wohlen	1–2	Brühl
Lausanne-Sport	6–1	FC Forward Morges
La Chaux-de-Fonds	17–2	Stade Lausanne
FC Olten	0–1	Young Boys
Fribourg	ppd	Monthey
Racing-Club Lausanne	2–3	Biel-Bienne
FC Le Locle	1–3	Cantonal Neuchâtel
FC Gloria (Le Locle)	2–10	Urania Genève Sport
Servette	4–1	Aarau

Rescheduled

Team 1	Score	Team 2
22 November 1931
Fribourg	3–0	Monthey

Replay

Team 1	Score	Team 2
22 November 1931
Lugano	0–1	Basel

=== Matches ===
1 November 1932
14:40

Basel	3–3 (a.e.t.)	Lugano
Enderlin (I) 47' (1:3); Haftl 75' (2:3); Hufschmid 80' (3:3)	FCB summary	5' (0:1) Lestina; 14' (0:2) Ranzi; 20' (0:3) Poretti

Landhof, Basel
Attendance: 5,000
Referee: (Switzerland) Schrumpf (Zürich)
- Both teams played the 1931/32 season in the Nationalliga (top-tier).

22 November 1931
14:00
Replay

Lugano	0–1	Basel
	FCB summary	2' (0:1) Schlecht

Campo Marzio, Lugano
Attendance: 3,000
Referee: (Switzerland) Hans Wüthrich Bern

- An episode that is noted in association with the Swiss Cup this season, is the second-round replay Lugano against Basel on 22 November 1931. The mood amongst the 3,000 spectators was heated even before the kick-off. This because after the 3–3 draw in the first game; the local press had circulated the most incredible rumours. As the game was started, Basel's Alfred Schlecht scored the winning goal early, not even two minutes after the game had begun. Then however, shortly before the end of the match, referee Hans Wüthrich did not blow his whistle to award a penalty for the home team after an alleged handball by a Basel player. The referee ended the game shortly afterwards with a Basel victory and the ill tempers were worsened. After the game there were tumults and riots among the spectators who were not satisfied with the referee's performance. Stones were thrown at the referee and towards the players and the windows of the changing rooms were smashed. It was some eight hours later, before things were settled enough, for the police to able to bring both the referee and the entire Basel team to safety, by ship over Lake Lugano. According to the reports in the club chronicles, quite a few players were injured. Josef Remay had a bleeding head, Hermann Enderlin had a hole above his eye, Leopold Kielholz and goalkeeper Paul Blumer were also hurt quite badly.

1 November 1932
14:30

Blue Stars	2–0	Zürich
Rey 5' (1:0); Gobet 40' (2:0)	FCZ summary

Letzigrund, Zürich
Attendance: 5,500
Referee: (Switzerland) René Mercet (Locarno und Lausanne)
- Both teams played the 1931/32 season in the Nationalliga (top-tier).

1 November 1932

Servette	4–1	Aarau
Rier; Rier; Wassilief; Tax	Servette summary FCA summary	Goal

Stade des Charmilles, Geneva
- Both teams played the 1931/32 season in the Nationalliga (top-tier).

== Round 3 ==
=== Summary ===
Team 1	Score	Team 2
13 December 1931
Servette	2–1 * Awd 0–3	Lausanne-Sport
Kickers Luzern	0–5	Blue Stars
Brühl	1–4	Basel
Young Fellows	2–2 (a.e.t.)	Bellinzona
Grasshopper Club	11–1	Old Boys
Fribourg	0–1	Young Boys
La Chaux-de-Fonds	2–0	Cantonal Neuchâtel
9 January 1932
Urania Genève Sport	4–3 (a.e.t.)	Biel-Bienne

- Note to result Servette–Lausanne: Result annulled. The match was awarded as a 0–3 victory for Lausanne.

Replay

Team 1	Score	Team 2
20 December 1931
Bellinzona	0–1	Young Fellows

=== Matches ===
13 December 1931

Servette	2–1 Annulled Awarded 0–3	Lausanne-Sport
Passello 12' (1:0); Rier 42' (2:1)	Servette summary	36' (2:1) Friedmann

Stade des Charmilles, Geneva
- Note to result Servette–Lausanne: The result was annulled because Servette played with too many foreign players at the same time (Karl Rappan and Francesco Rier). The match was awarded as a 0–3 victory for Lausanne.
- Servette played the 1931/32 season in the Nationalliga (top-tier), Lausanne in the 1. Liga (second tier).

13 December 1931

Kickers Luzern	0–5	Blue Stars
	RSSSF summary	44' (pen.) Rey; 52' (0:2) Springer; 64' (0:3) Gobet; 72' (0:5) Springer; 85' (0:5) Rey

Stadion Auf Tribschen, Lucerne
- The Kickers played the 1931/32 season in the 2. Liga (third tier), Blue Stars in the Nationalliga (top-tier).

13 December 1931

SC Brühl St. Gallen	1–4	Basel
Joseph (1:4)	FCB summary	22' (0:1) Müller (0:2) Haftl; 60' (0:3) Müller; 78' (0:4) Kielholz

Krontal, St. Gallen
Attendance: 2,000
Referee: (Switzerland) Ernst Brüschweiler (Zürich)
- Brühl played the 1931/32 season in the 1. Liga (second tier), Basel in the Nationalliga (top-tier).

13 December 1931

Young Fellows	2–2 (a.e.t.)	Bellinzona
Martin 60' (1:1); Gyurko 103' (2:2)	RSSSF summary	4' (1:0) Berini; 90' (og 1:2) (Fehr)

Utogrund, Zürich
- Young Fellows played the 1931/32 season in the Nationalliga (top-tier), Bellinzona in the 2. Liga (third tier)

20 December 1931
Replay

Bellinzona	0–1	Young Fellows
	RSSSF summary	75' (0:1) Gyurko

Stadio Comunale Bellinzona, Bellinzona

13 December 1931

Grasshopper Club	11–1	Old Boys
5x Hitrec; 2x A. Abegglen; 2x Max Abegglen; Živković	RSSSF summary	Bucher

Hardturm, Zürich
- Both teams played the 1931/32 season in the Nationalliga (top-tier).

13 December 1931

Fribourg	0–1	Young Boys
	RSSSF summary	40' (0:1) Gerold

Stade Universitaire, Fribourg
- Fribourg played the 1931/32 season in the 1. Liga (second tier), Young Boys in the Nationalliga (top-tier).

13 December 1931

La Chaux-de-Fonds	2–0	Cantonal Neuchâtel
Grimm 35' (1:0); Haefeli 55' (2:0)	RSSSF summary

Centre Sportif de la Charrière, La Chaux-de-Fonds
- La Chaux-de-Fonds played the 1931/32 season in the Nationalliga (top-tier), Cantonal in the 1. Liga (second tier).

9 January 1932

Urania Genève Sport	4–3 (a.e.t.)	Biel-Bienne
Chabanel; Chabanel; Zila 85' (pen.); Loichot 100' (4:3)	RSSSF summary	25' Wenger; 60' Zech; 75' Ponzinibio

Stade de Frontenex, Genève
- Both teams played the 1931/32 season in the Nationalliga (top-tier).

== Quarter-finals ==
=== Summary ===
Team 1	Score	Team 2
7 February 1932
Grasshopper Club	3–1	Blue Stars
Urania Genève Sport	1–1 (a.e.t.)	Young Fellows
Lausanne-Sport	5–0	Young Boys
Basel	6–3	La Chaux-de-Fonds

Replay

Team 1	Score	Team 2
28 February 1932
Young Fellows	2–6	Urania Genève Sport

=== Matches ===
7 February 1932

Grasshopper Club	3–1	Blue Stars
A. Abegglen; Hitrec; Max Abegglen	RSSSF summary	(o.g.) (Minelli)

Hardturm, Zürich

7 February 1932

Urania Genève Sport	1–1 (a.e.t.)	Young Fellows
Stalder 42' (1:1)	RSSSF summary	12' (0:1) Winkler

Stade de Frontenex, Genève

28 February 1932
Replay

Young Fellows	2–6	Urania Genève Sport
Martin; Roomberg	RSSSF summary	2x Jäggi; 3x Sekulić; 1x Syrvet

Utogrund, Zürich

7 February 1932

Lausanne-Sport	5–0	Young Boys
Kramer 5' (1:0); Weiler 50' (2:0); Tschirren 55' (3:0); Weiler (4:0); Kramer 89' (5:0)	RSSSF summary

Pontaise, Lausanne

7 February 1932
14:30

Basel	6–3	La Chaux-de-Fonds
Haftl 24' (1:0); Haftl 32' (2:0); Müller 36' (3:0); Hiss 40' (4:0); Kielholz (5:1); Kielholz (6:2)	FCB summary	55' (4:1) Ducommun; 73' (5:2) Grimm; 88' (6:3) Romy

Landhof, Basel
Attendance: 3,000
Referee: (Switzerland) Ernest Meyer (Lausanne)

== Semi-finals ==
=== Summary ===
Team 1	Score	Team 2
13 March 1932
Basel	1–8	Grasshopper Club
Lausanne-Sport	1–2	Urania Genève Sport

=== Matches ===
13 March 1932
15:00

Basel	1–8	Grasshopper Club
Jaeck 18' (pen 1:2)	FCB summary	8' (0:1) Adam; 10' (0:2) Hitrec; 20' (1:3) Max Abegglen; 40' (1:4) Hitrec; 70' (1:5) Hitrec; 75' (1:6) A. Abegglen; 79' (1:7) Hitrec; 85' (1:8) Živković

Landhof, Basel
Attendance: 9,000
Referee: (Switzerland) Osterwalder Bern

13 March 1932

Lausanne-Sport	1–2	Urania Genève Sport
Tschirren 25' (1:2)	RSSSF summary	6' (0:1) Syrvet; 21' (0:2) Chabanel

Stadion Neufeld, Bern
Attendance: 5,000
Referee: (Switzerland) Walter Jordan (Basel)

== Final ==
The final was held at the Hardturm Sportplatz in Zürich on Sunday 3 April 1932.

=== Summary ===
Team 1	Score	Team 2
3 April 1932
Grasshopper Club	5–1	Urania Genève Sport

=== Telegram ===
3 April 1932

Grasshopper Club	5–1	Urania Genève Sport
Max Abegglen 8' (1:0); Hitrec 13' (2:0); Živković 66' (3:1); Hitrec 68' (4:1); A. Abegglen 84' (pen.)	Fussball-Schweiz summary	53' (2:1) Syrvet

Hardturm Sportplatz, Zürich
Attendance: 18,000
Referee: (Switzerland) Paul Ruoff (Bern)

Grasshopper Club won the cup and this was the club's third cup title to this date.

== Further in Swiss football ==
- 1931–32 Nationalliga
- 1931–32 Swiss 1. Liga

== Sources ==
- Fussball-Schweiz
- FCB Cup games 1931–32 at fcb-achiv.ch
- Switzerland 1931–32 at RSSSF

Preceded by 1930–31	Swiss Cup seasons	Succeeded by 1932–33
