= 1931–32 Nationalliga =

Swiss football season

Nationalliga
- Season: 1931–32
- Dates: 30 August 1931 to 3 July 1932
- Champions: Lausanne-Sports; Group 1 winners: Zürich; Group 2 winners: Grasshopper Club
- Relegated: Bern; St. Gallen; Old Boys; Étoile-Sporting
- Matches: 2x 72 and 1 decider plus 7 play-offs and 1 final

The following is the summary of the Swiss Nationalliga in the 1931–32 football season. This was the 35th season of top-tier football in Switzerland.

== Overview ==
=== Preamble ===
The Swiss Football Association (ASF/SFV) were modifying the formats in the football league system. Last season the top-tier (called Serie A) had 33 Clubs, which had been divided into three regional groups. From here onwards, the top-tier was now named Nationalliga and the number of clubs had been reduced. This season the top-tier had only 18 teams which were divided into two groups and in the following season would be reduced to 16 clubs, also in two groups. From the 1931–32 Nationalliga season the Nationalliga would be contested in one national division with 16 clubs.

This season a new second division was created, 1931–32 Swiss 1. Liga, with 18 teams divided into two regional groups. The former second-tier which had been 54 teams in 6 regional groups, now became the third-tier. The season was played from 30 August 1931 to 1 May 1932, with a few rescheduled games being played later in May. The championship play-off rounds took place from 29 May to 26 June 1932.

=== Format ===
The 18 teams were divided into two groups and within the each group the teams played a double round-robin to decide their league table positions. Two points were awarded for a win and one point was awarded for a draw. Four teams qualified for the championship play-offs. The first placed team in each group at the end of the qualification stage were qualified directly for the play-offs. The two second placed teams competed a decider for the third qualification slot. The fourth contender of the final group was the curiosity here, because the second-tier champions were also qualified for this championship group. The play-off was contested as a single round robin. The winners of the play-offs were awarded the Swiss championship title.

The last two placed teams in each qualification group were relegated to the 1932–33 Swiss 1. Liga. Only the two group winners in the second-tier, 1. Liga, would both achieve promotion this season, thus reducing the top-tier to 16 teams for the 1932–33 season.

== Nationalliga ==
=== Group 1 ===
==== Teams, locations ====
Team	Based in	Canton	Stadium	Capacity
FC Basel	Basel	Basel-Stadt	Landhof	4,000
FC Bern	Bern	Bern	Stadion Neufeld	14,000
FC La Chaux-de-Fonds	La Chaux-de-Fonds	Neuchâtel	Centre Sportif de la Charrière	12,700
FC Lugano	Lugano	Ticino	Cornaredo Stadium	6,330
FC Nordstern Basel	Basel	Basel-Stadt	Rankhof	7,600
FC St. Gallen	St. Gallen	St. Gallen	Espenmoos	11,000
Urania Genève Sport	Genève	Geneva	Stade de Frontenex	4,000
FC Young Fellows	Zürich	Zürich	Utogrund	2,850
FC Zürich	Zürich	Zürich	Letzigrund	25,000

==== League table ====
Pos	Team	Pld	W	D	L	GF	GA	GD	Pts	Qualification or relegation
1	Zürich	16	13	0	3	44	17	+27	26	Qualified for play-offs
2	Urania Genève Sport	16	9	1	6	34	24	+10	19	To decider for play-offs
3	Young Fellows Zürich	16	8	2	6	44	36	+8	18	
4	Lugano	16	7	3	6	31	22	+9	17	
5	Nordstern Basel	16	7	2	7	28	35	−7	16	
6	La Chaux-de-Fonds	16	7	1	8	35	34	+1	15	
7	Basel	16	7	1	8	35	48	−13	15	
8	Bern	16	4	3	9	28	43	−15	11	Relegated to 1933–34 1. Liga
9	FC St. Gallen	16	2	3	11	35	55	−20	7	Relegated to 1933–34 1. Liga

Source: rsssf.com
Rules for classification: 1) Points; 2) Goal difference within the league, however with play-off for qualifiers;

==== Results ====
Home \ Away	BAS	BER	CDF	LUG	NOR	STG	UGS	YFZ	ZÜR
Basel		2–2	2–5	3–0	3–1	3–2	0–6	1–4	0–3
Bern	3–4		5–0	1–3	2–0	1–5	0–3	0–8	1–0
La Chaux-de-Fonds	2–6	2–0		3–0	3–1	10–2	1–2	3–0	0–3
Lugano	8–1	3–1	2–0		1–2	6–1	1–2	3–2	0–1
Nordstern	2–0	2–1	3–1	0–0		0–0	4–1	4–2	2–1
St. Gallen	2–4	3–3	2–2	1–3	8–1		0–1	1–2	3–4
Urania	4–1	0–3	3–2	0–0	1–0	5–0		2–3	0–1
Young Fellows	0–4	3–3	3–0	1–1	6–4	6–2	3–2		0–2
Zürich	4–1	5–2	0–1	2–0	5–2	4–2	5–2	4–1	

Source: rsssf.com
Legend: Blue = home team win; Yellow = draw; Red = away team win.

=== Group 2 ===
==== Teams, locations ====
Team	Based in	Canton	Stadium	Capacity
FC Aarau	Aarau	Aargau	Stadion Brügglifeld	9,240
FC Biel-Bienne	Biel/Bienne	Bern	Stadion Gurzelen	15,000
FC Blue Stars Zürich	Zürich	Zürich	Hardhof	1,000
Étoile Carouge FC	Carouge	Geneva	Stade de la Fontenette	3,690
FC Étoile-Sporting	La Chaux-de-Fonds	Neuchâtel	Les Foulets / Terrain des Eplatures	1,000 / 500
Grasshopper Club	Zürich	Zürich	Hardturm	20,000
BSC Old Boys	Basel	Basel-Stadt	Stadion Schützenmatte	8,000
Servette FC	Geneva	Geneva	Stade des Charmilles	27,000
Young Boys	Bern	Bern	Wankdorf Stadium	56,000

==== League table ====
Pos	Team	Pld	W	D	L	GF	GA	GD	Pts	Qualification or relegation
1	Grasshopper Club	16	12	2	2	54	12	+42	26	Qualified for play-offs
2	Biel-Bienne	16	8	4	4	26	23	+3	20	To decider for play-offs
3	Young Boys	16	7	5	4	29	22	+7	19	
4	Étoile Carouge	16	4	7	5	33	30	+3	15	
5	Aarau	16	6	3	7	21	32	−11	15	
6	Blue Stars	16	6	2	8	26	24	+2	14	
7	Servette	16	5	2	9	18	33	−15	12	To play-out against relegation
8	Étoile-Sporting	16	5	2	9	21	41	−20	12	To play-out against relegation
9	Old Boys	16	3	5	8	20	31	−11	11	Relegated to 1933–34 1. Liga

Source: rsssf.com
Rules for classification: 1) Points; 2) Goal difference within the league, however with play-off for qualifiers;

==== Results ====
Home \ Away	AAR	BSZ	BIE	ÉTC	ÉTS	GCZ	OBB	SER	YB
Aarau		2–1	2–2	2–1	2–4	0–8	2–1	0–1	3–2
Blue Stars	0–1		1–3	2–0	3–1	2–0	5–0	1–1	2–0
Biel-Bienne	1–1	0–0		1–4	2–1	0–4	5–2	0–2	2–0
Étoile Carouge	2–0	5–3	1–3		5–2	1–1	3–3	2–2	0–0
Étoile-Sporting	2–1	0–3	0–2	3–3		0–4	1–0	2–0	1–4
Grasshopper Club	0–1	3–4	4–1	1–0	9–0		1–2	5–1	2–2
Old Boys	0–0	1–2	0–2	2–2	1–1	1–2		0–2	0–2
Servette	4–1	2–0	1–2	3–1	0–2	0–4	5–2		2–0
Young Boys	3–1	3–1	0–0	2–2	2–1	1–5	1–1	4–1	

Source: rsssf.com
Legend: Blue = home team win; Yellow = draw; Red = away team win.

==== Decider against relegation ====
The eighth position in the table was the second relegation slot. Because Servette and Étoile-Sporting ended the qualification stage level on points in joint seventh/eighth position a decider against relegation was required. This match was played on 29 May 1932 at the Stade de la Maladière in Neuchâtel.

Team 1	Score	Team 2
Servette	5–1	Étoile-Sporting

Servette won and were in seventh position, therefore they remained in the division for the next season. Étoile-Sporting were in eighth position and were relegated to 1933–34 1. Liga.

=== Championship play-offs ===
==== Decider for play-off ====
The two second placed teams Urania Genève Sport and Biel-Bienne contested a play-off to decide who would qualify for the final round. The match took place at the Pontaise in Lausanne on 29 May 1932.

Team 1	Score	Team 2
Urania Genève Sport	4–3	Biel-Bienne

Urania Genève Sport' won and continued to the final round, Biel-Bienne's season was finished.

==== Championship group ====
Pos	Team	Pld	W	D	L	GF	GA	GD	Pts	Qualification	LS	ZÜR	GCZ	UGS
1	Lausanne-Sports	3	1	2	0	6	4	+2	4	Play-off for championship	—	4–2	2–2	—
2	Zürich	3	2	0	1	6	6	0	4	Play-off for championship	—	—	1–0	3–2
3	Grasshopper Club	3	1	1	1	4	3	+1	3		—	—	—	3–1
4	Urania Genève Sport	3	0	1	2	4	7	−3	1		1–1	—	—	—

Source: rsssf.com
Rules for classification: 1) Points; 2) Play-off.

==== Championship final ====
Because Lausanne-Sports and Zürich ended the play-off group level on points in joint first position a decider for the championship was required. This final was played at the Stadion Neufeld in Bern on 3 July 1932.

3 July 1932
17:00

Lausanne-Sports	5–2	Zürich
Widmer (o.g.); Gerhold 52'; Leonhardt 64'; Kramer 82'; Tschirren 86'	FCZ summary	30' Lehmann; 64' Humenberger

Stadion Wankdorf, Bern
Attendance: 10,000
Referee: (Switzerland) Hans Wüthrich

Because Lausanne-Sports won the play-off final, the curiosity of the season had occurred, the winners of the very first 1. Liga season also became Swiss champions. This was the first and only time that a team from the second-tier won the championship title. This was the clubs second championship title to this date.

== Further in Swiss football ==
- 1931–32 Swiss Cup
- 1931–32 Swiss 1. Liga

== Sources ==
- Switzerland 1931–32 at RSSSF

Preceded by 1930–31	Nationalliga seasons in Switzerland	Succeeded by 1932–33
