= 1932–33 Swiss Cup =

Tournament details
- Country: Switzerland

Final positions
- Champions: Basel
- Runners-up: Grasshopper Club

The 1932–33 Swiss Cup was the 8th edition of Switzerland's football cup competition, organised annually since the 1925–26 season by the Swiss Football Association.

== Overview ==
This season's cup competition began with two preliminary rounds, which were held before the main competition began. These two rounds were played during the last two week-ends of August and the first week-end of September 1933. The first principal round was played at the beginning of October. The competition was to be completed on Sunday 9 April 1933, with the final, which this year was held at the Hardturm in Zürich.

The preliminary rounds were held for the lower league teams that were not qualified for the main rounds. Reserve teams were not admitted to the competition. The 16 clubs from the 1932–33 Nationalliga (at this time the top-tier was divided into two groups) and the 18 clubs from this season's 1. Liga (at this time the second-tier was also divided into two groups) joined the competition in the first principal round, which was played on Sunday 2 October.

The matches were played in a knockout format. In the event of a draw after 90 minutes, the match went into extra time. In the event of a draw at the end of extra time, if agreed between the clubs, a second extra time was played. If the score was still level at the final whistle, a replay was foreseen and this was played on the visiting team's pitch. If the replay ended in a draw after extra time, or if no replay was not agreed, a toss of a coin would establish the team that qualified for the next round.

== Preliminary rounds ==
The lower league teams that had not qualified for the competition competed here in two preliminary knockout rounds. Reserve teams were not admitted to the competition. The aim of this preliminary stage was to reduce the number of lower league teams to 28 before the first main round, to join the 34 clubs from the top two tiers. The draw in the preliminary stage and in the early rounds of the main competition respected local regionalities. Both preliminary rounds were played in advance of the lower leagues regional season.

=== First preliminary round ===
Team 1	Score	Team 2
21 August 1932
Helvetik Basel	4–6	Cercle des Sports Bienne
Zähringia Bern	0–9	FC Madretsch (Biel)
FC Viktoria Bern	3–2	FC Nidau
Delémont	5–2	FC Liestal
Central Fribourg	5–0	FC Xamax (Neuchâtel)
Fribourg	FF; Awd 3–0 *	FC Forward Morges
CA Genève	1–4	FC Yverdon
FC St-Jean Genève	2–5	Comète Peseux
FC Gloria (Le Locle)	4–0	CS La Tour-de-Peilz
Moutier	3–1	FC Sissach
Stade Nyonnais	2–4	FC Fleurier
FC Porrentruy	2–1	SC Kleinhüningen
Olympia Vevey	0–2	FC Boudry
Villeuve-Sports	2–4	Vevey Sports
FC Sierre	4–2	FC Le Locle
FC Renens	3–0	FC Chailly
FC Fortuna (SG)	8–0	FC Lachen
Bülach	2–4	FC Horgen
FC Thalwil	2–7	Frauenfeld
Spvvg Schaffhausen	0–3	FC Wädenswil
FC Suhr	1–4	FC Langnau am Albis (ZH)
FC Buchs (SG)	0–3	FC Industrie
FC Weinfelden	1–5	FC Romanshorn
SC Balerna	4–5	FC Neuhausen
FC Phönix (Winterthur)	2–6	SC Zug
FC Tössfeld (Winterthur)	1–6	Uster
GC Luganesi	2–1	FC Lenzburg
FC Töss (Winterthur)	7–1	FC Altstetten (Zürich)
FC Adliswil	0–8	Kreuzlingen
Arbon	5–0	Zofingen
Kickers Luzern	1–5	Juventus Zürich
SC Veltheim (Winterthur)	3–4	FC Gränichen
SV Höngg	2–2 (a.e.t.)	Hakoah Zürich
FC Biberist	2–8	Sportfreunde Basel
FC Langnau im Emmental (BE)	5–3	Thun
FC Breite (Basel)	2–0	Sport Boys Bern
Black Stars	5–3	FC Langenthal
FC Münchenstein	2–4	Burgdorf
Esperia Bern	2–5	Dornach
FC Allschwil	3–2	FC Länggasse (Bern)
Sparta Schaffhausen	2–2 (a.e.t.)	FC Dietikon
Wohlen	2–2 (a.e.t.)	Chiasso
28 August 1932
Sylva-Sports (Le Locle)	0–1	USI Dopolavoro Genève
Concordia Yverdon	2–9	Monthey
FC Jonction (Genève)	3–2	Chênois
Stade Lausanne	2–1	Martigny-Sports
FC Le Parc (La Chaux-de-Fonds)	5–0	Richemond-Daillettes (FR)
FC Buchs (AG)	2–0	FC Tramelan
FC Reconvilier	4–2	Minerva Bern
Baden	1–2	FC Diana Zürich
FC Tavannes	3–3 (a.e.t.) *	FC Birsfelden (t)

- Note to match Fribourg–Morges: Forward Morges declaied forfeit and the match was awarded as 3–0 victory for Fribourg.
- Note (t): Match Tavannes–Birsfelden no replay was agreed between the two teams. Birsfelden qualified on toss of a coin.

Replays

Team 1	Score	Team 2
28 August 1932
Hakoah Zürich (t)	1–1 (a.e.t.) *	SV Höngg
FC Dietikon	2–3	Sparta Schaffhausen
Chiasso	2–0	Wohlen

- Note (t): The replay Hakoah–Höngg ended in a draw after exra-time. Hakoah Zürich qualified on toss of a coin.

=== Second preliminary round ===
Team 1	Score	Team 2
4 September 1932
FC Le Parc (La Chaux-de-Fonds)	0–3	Sion
USI Dopolavoro Genève	0–3	FC Yverdon
Vevey Sports	6–1	Comète Peseux
FC Boudry	3–2	FC Renens
FC Sierre	5–4	FC Fleurier
Monthey	5–1	FC Jonction (Genève)
FC Reconvilier	0–4	FC Buchs (AG)
Cercle des Sports Bienne	5–3	FC Viktoria Bern
FC Allschwil	2–0	FC Porrentruy
FC Madretsch (Biel)	5–2	FC Breite (Basel)
Sportfreunde Basel	1–6	Burgdorf
Delémont	3–1	Dornach
Juventus Zürich	7–3	FC Industrie
SC Zug	4–1	FC Gränichen
GC Luganesi	1–4	Kreuzlingen
Chiasso	4–0	FC Töss (Winterthur)
FC Wädenswil	5–0	FC Langnau am Albis (ZH)
Hakoah Zürich	3–4 (a.e.t.)	Frauenfeld
FC Birsfelden	1–0	Black Stars
FC Langnau im Emmental (BE)	FF; Awd 0–3 *	Moutier
FC Neuhausen	FF; Awd 0–3 *	FC Horgen
11 September 1932
Stade Lausanne	5–1	Fribourg
FC Romanshorn	0–2	FC Fortuna (SG)
25 September 1932
Arbon	2–5	Sparta Schaffhausen

- The teams Central Fribourg, FC Gloria (Le Locle), FC Diana Zürich and Uster qualified for the next round with byes.
- Note to match Langnau–Moutier: Langnau declaired forfeit and the match was awarded as a 0–3 victory for Moutier.
- Note to match Neuhausen–Horgen: Neuhausen declaired forfeit and the match was awarded as a 0–3 victory for Horgen.

== First principal round ==
=== Summary ===
Team 1	Score	Team 2
2 October 1932
Concordia Basel	2–4	Basel
Sparta Schaffhausen	0–1	Blue Stars
Young Fellows	3–1	Chiasso
St. Gallen	3–1	FC Wädenswil
Locarno	10–2	FC Diana Zürich
Lugano	6–0	FC Fortuna (SG)
SV Seebach (Zürich)	1–5 (a.e.t.)	Zürich
Nordstern	0–3	Kreuzlingen
Luzern	4–0	FC Allschwil
Frauenfeld	0–7	Grasshopper Club
Uster	5–2	SC Zug
Old Boys	0–8 *	Bellinzona
Brühl	3–1	FC Oerlikon (ZH)
Juventus Zürich	1–0	FC Birsfelden
SC Balerna	FF; Awd 3–0 *	FC Horgen
Winterthur	2–0	FC Buchs (AG)
Lausanne-Sport	4–0	Étoile-Sporting
La Chaux-de-Fonds	5–0	Solothurn
Aarau	4–1	FC Olten
Urania Genève Sport	9–1	FC Sierre
Grenchen	8–1	FC Yverdon
Young Boys	2–0	Biel-Bienne
Servette	16–0	Burgdorf
Etoile Carouge	9–1	FC Gloria (Le Locle)
Monthey	2–1 (a.e.t.)	Cercle des Sports Bienne
US Bienne-Boujean	0–1	Racing-Club Lausanne
Moutier	4–3	Sion
Vevey Sports	1–3	Montreux-Sports
Delémont	5–2	FC Boudry
Bern	10–3	Lengnau
FC Madretsch (Biel)	7–5	Central Fribourg
23 October 1932
Cantonal Neuchâtel	3–0	Stade Lausanne

- The match Old Boys–Bellinzona was played in Bellinzona. The match was scheduled to be played in Basel, but Old Boys accepted Bellinzona's proposal to play on their pitch.
- Note to match Balerna–Horgen: Horgen declaired forfeit and the match was awarded as a 3–0 victory for Balerna.

=== Matches ===
2 October 1932

Basel	4–2	Concordia Basel
Wesely 15' (1:1); Wesely (2:1); Haftl (3:1); Hummel (4:1)	FCB summary	(0:1) Rufer; 90' (4:2) Rufer

Landhof, Basel
Attendance: 4,000
Referee: (Switzerland) Hans Wüthrich, (Bern)
- Both teams played the 1932/33 season in the Nationalliga (top-tier), Basel in Group 1 and Concordia in Group 2.

2 October 1932
13:30

SV Seebach (Zürich)	1–5 (a.e.t.)	Zürich
Ulrich (1:0)	FCZ summary	77' (1:1) Hollenstein; 101' (1:2) Hollenstein; 102' (1:3) Hollenstein (1:4) Hollenstein (1:5) Bösch

Letzigrund, Zürich
Attendance: 1,000
Referee: (Switzerland) Schrumpf (Zürich)
- Seebach played the 1932/33 season in the 1. Liga (second tier) Group East, Zürich ib the Nationalliga (top-tier) Group 2.

2 October 1932

Aarau	4–1	FC Olten
Goal	FCA summary	Goal

Stadion Brügglifeld, Aarau
- Aarau played the 1932/33 season in the Nationalliga (top-tier) Group 2, Olten in the 1. Liga (second tier) Group West.

2 October 1932

Servette	16–0	Burgdorf
6x Tax; 4x Passello; 3x Thurling; 2x Kielholz; 1x Frigerio	Servette summary

Stade des Charmilles, Geneva
- Servette played the 1932/33 season in the Nationalliga (top-tier) Group 2, Burgdorf in the 3. Liga (fourth tier).

== Round 2 ==
=== Summary ===
Team 1	Score	Team 2
13 November 1932
Basel	3–0	Blue Stars
Young Fellows	1–3	St. Gallen
Locarno	1–3	Lugano
Zürich	3–0	Kreuzlingen
Luzern	0–6	Grasshopper Club
Uster	1–6	Bellinzona
Brühl	2–5	Juventus Zürich
SC Balerna	0–5	Winterthur
Lausanne-Sport	1–0	La Chaux-de-Fonds
Aarau	2–5	Urania Genève Sport
Grenchen	1–2 (a.e.t.)	Young Boys
Servette	0–1	Etoile Carouge
Monthey	1–2	Racing-Club Lausanne
Moutier	5–5 (a.e.t.)	Montreux-Sports
Delémont	1–8	Cantonal Neuchâtel
Bern	5–0	FC Madretsch (Biel)

Replay

Team 1	Score	Team 2
27 November 1932
Montreux-Sports	6–4	Moutier

=== Matches ===
13 November 1932
14:30

Basel	3–0	Blue Stars Zürich
Müller 34' (1:0); Haftl 59' (2:0); Hummel (3:0)	FCB summary

Landhof, Basel
Attendance: 2,500
Referee: (Switzerland) J. Besomo (Neuchâtel)
- Both teams played the 1932/33 season in the Nationalliga (top-tier), Basel in Group 1 and Blue Stars in Group 2.

13 November 1932
14:30

Zürich	3–0	Kreuzlingen
Weiermann 8' (1:0); Hollenstein 60' (2:0); Stelzer 79' (3:0)	FCZ summary

Letzigrund, Zürich
Attendance: 2,500
Referee: (Switzerland) Ernst Meier (St. Gallen)
- Zürich played the 1932/33 season in the Nationalliga (top-tier) Group 2, Kreuzlingen in the 2. Liga (third tier).

13 November 1932

Aarau '	2–5	Urania Genève Sport
Goal	FCA summary	Goal

Stadion Brügglifeld, Aarau
- Both teams played the 1932/33 season in the Nationalliga (top-tier), Aarau in Group 2, Urania in Group 1.

13 November 1932

Servette	0–1	Etoile Carouge
	Servette summary	Goal

Stade des Charmilles, Geneva
- Both teams played the 1932/33 season in the Nationalliga (top-tier), Servette in Group 2, Etoile Carouge in Group 1.

== Round 3 ==
=== Summary ===
Team 1	Score	Team 2
4 December 1932
Young Boys	7–0	Cantonal Neuchâtel
Lugano	7–0	St. Gallen
Grasshopper Club	11–1	Juventus Zürich
Zürich	5–1	Winterthur
Montreux-Sports	1–12	Urania Genève Sport
Bern	0–4	Lausanne-Sport
Etoile Carouge	3–0	Racing-Club Lausanne
Bellinzona	2–3 (a.e.t.)	Basel

=== Matches ===
4 December 1932

Young Boys	7–0	Cantonal Neuchâtel
Hochsträsser 7' (1:0); Handley 17' (2:0); Schicker 50' (3:0); Hochsträsser 52' (4:0); O´Neill 65' (5:0); Hochsträsser 68' (6:0); O´Neill 80' (7:0)	RSSSF summary

Wankdorf Stadium, Bern
- Young Boys played the 1932/33 season in the Nationalliga (top-tier) Group 2, Cantonal Neuchâtel in the 1. Liga (second tier) Group West.

4 December 1932

Lugano	7–0	St. Gallen
4x Poretti; 2x Wilhelm; 1x Papa	RSSSF summary

Campo Marzio, Lugano
- Lugano played the 1932/33 season in the Nationalliga (top-tier) Group 1, St. Gallen in the 1. Liga (second tier) Group East.

4 December 1932

Grasshopper Club	11–1	Juventus Zürich
4x Hitrec; 3x A. Abegglen; 3x Max Abegglen; 1x Fauguel	RSSSF summary	Gianola

Hardturm, Zürich
- GC played the 1932/33 season in the Nationalliga (top-tier) Group 1, Juventus Zürich in the 2. Liga (third tier).

4 December 1932

Zürich	5–1	Winterthur
A. Lehmann 17' (1:0); Wilhelm (2:0); A. Lehmann (3:0); A. Lehmann 43' (4:0); Wilhelm (5:0)	FCZ summary	86' (5:1) Brönnimann

Letzigrund, Zürich
- Zürich played the 1932/33 season in the Nationalliga (top-tier) Group 2, Winterthur in the 1. Liga (second tier) Group East.

4 December 1932

Montreux-Sports	1–12	Urania Genève Sport
1x Bernard II	RSSSF summary	1x (pen.) Ross; 8x Jäggi IV; 2x Syrvet; 1x Neuri

Stade de Chailly, Montreux
- Montreux played the 1932/33 season in the 1. Liga (second tier) Group West, Urania in the Nationalliga (top-tier) Group 1.

4 December 1932

Bern	0–4	Lausanne-Sport
	RSSSF summary	(0:1) Bossi; 50' (0:2) Kramer; 75' (0:3) Spagnoli; 76' (0:4) Spagnoli

- Bern played the 1932/33 season in the 1. Liga (second tier) Group West, Lausanne-Sport in the Nationalliga (top-tier) Group 2.

4 December 1932

Etoile Carouge	3–0	Racing-Club Lausanne
Losio 39' (1:0); Vaccani 58' (2:0); Borcier 77' (3:0)	RSSSF summary

Stade de la Fontenette, Carouge
- Etoile Carouge played the 1932/33 season in the Nationalliga (top-tier) Group 1, Racing-Club Lausanne in the 1. Liga (second tier) Group West.

8 December 1932

AC Bellinzona	2–3 (a.e.t.)	Basel
Berini 51' (1:2); Treier 55' (2:2)	FCB summary	25' (0:1) Haftl; 49' (0:2) Haftl (2:3) Wesely

Campo Granata, Bellinzona
Attendance: 1,100
Referee: (Switzerland) Willy Dagon (Solothurn)
- Bellinzona played the 1932/33 season in the 1. Liga (second tier) Group East, Basel in the Nationalliga (top-tier).

== Quarter-finals ==
=== Summary ===
Team 1	Score	Team 2
5 February 1933
Grasshopper Club	5–0	Zürich
Young Boys	4–2	Etoile Carouge
Lausanne-Sport	6–1	Urania Genève Sport
Basel	4–2	Lugano

=== Matches ===
5 February 1933

Grasshopper Club	5–0	Zürich
Hitrec 8' (1:0); Max Abegglen 13' (2:0); A. Abegglen 19' (3:0); Hitrec 73' (4:0); A. Abegglen 85' (5:0)	FCZ summary

Hardturm, Zürich
Attendance: 7,000
Referee: (Switzerland) Hans Wüthrich, (Bern)

5 February 1933

Young Boys	4–2	Etoile Carouge
O'Neill 16' (1:0); O'Neill 70' (2:1); Schicker 80' (3:1); Schott 85' (4:2)	RSSSF summary	20' (1:1) Vaccani; 81' (3:2) Buchoux

Wankdorf Stadium, Bern

5 February 1933

Lausanne-Sport	6–1	Urania Genève Sport
Bossi 20' (1:0); 3x Ch. Lehmann II; 1x Kramer; 1x Spagnoli	RSSSF summary	Ross

Pontaise, Lausanne

5 February 1933
14:30

Basel	4–2	Lugano
Hufschmid 35' (1:0); Hufschmid 48' (2:0); Wesely 70' (3:1); Müller 73' (4:1)	FCB Summary	(red card) 40' Gilardoni; 69' (2:1) Wilhelm; 86' (4:2) Gianinazzi

Landhof, Basel
Attendance: 6,500
Referee: (Switzerland) Rodolphe Wittwer (Genève)

== Semi-finals ==
=== Summary ===
Team 1	Score	Team 2
5 March 1933
Basel	5–3	Lausanne-Sport
Grasshopper Club	3–1	Young Boys

=== Matches ===
5 March 1933
15:00

Basel	5–3	Lausanne-Sport
Hufschmid 18' (1:1); Haftl 19' (2:1); Jäck 42' (3:1); Wesely 63' (4:2); Jäck 70' (pen. 5:2)	FCB summary	5' (0:1) Lehmann; 45' (3:2) Lehmann; 73' (5:3) Lehmann

Stadion Rankhof, Basel
Attendance: 4,000
Referee: (Switzerland) Hans Enderli (Winterthur)

5 March 1933

Grasshopper Club	3–1	Young Boys
Max Abegglen 5' (1:0); Hitrec 17' (2:0); Sekulić 21' (3:0)	RSSSF summary	30' (3:2) Handley

Hardturm, Zürich
Attendance: 16,000
Referee: (Switzerland) William Bangerter (La Chaux-de-Fonds)

== Final ==
The final was held in Zürich this year, at the Hardturm, on Sunday 9 April 1933.

=== Summary ===
Team 1	Score	Team 2
9 April 1933
Basel	4–3	Grasshopper Club

=== Telegram ===
9 April 1933
15:00

Basel	4–3	Grasshopper Club
Haftl 29' (1:1); Jäck 44' (2:1); Haftl 60' (3:1); Müller 68' (4:1)	Fussball-Schweiz summary FCB summary	23' (0:1) Hitrec; 71' (4:2) Schneider; 84' (pen. 4:3) A. Abegglen

Hardturm, Zürich
Attendance: 15,000
Referee: (Switzerland) Rodolphe Wittwer (Genève)

Basel won the cup and this was the club's first cup title, in fact, it was their very first trophy to that date.

== Further in Swiss football ==
- 1932–33 Nationalliga
- 1932–33 Swiss 1. Liga

== Sources ==
- Fussball-Schweiz
- FCB Cup games 1932–33 at fcb-achiv.ch
- Switzerland 1932–33 at RSSSF

Preceded by 1931–32	Swiss Cup seasons	Succeeded by 1933–34
