= 1932–33 Nationalliga =

Swiss football season

Nationalliga
- Season: 1932–33
- Dates: 28 August 1932 to 2 July 1933
- Champions: Servette
- Relegated: Étoile Carouge; Aarau
- Matches: 2x 56 and 2 deciders plus 6 play-offs and 1 final

The following is the summary of the Swiss Nationalliga in the 1932–33 football season. This was the 36th season of top-tier football in Switzerland.

== Overview ==
=== Preamble ===
The Swiss Football Association (ASF/SFV) had 16 member clubs in the top-tier and 18 clubs in the second-tier. This was two top-tier teams less than the previous season because the ASF/SFV were modifying the format in the top-tier. This was the last season that the clubs were divided into two groups, this season the teams drawn into their respective groups and they were not regional groups. Conclusively there was a championship play-off round. As of next season the Nationalliga would be played in one national group. This season was played from 28 August 1932 to 30 April, with a few rescheduled games being played in May 1933, with a winter break from November to February. The play-offs took place in June.

=== Format ===
The 16 teams were drawn into two groups and within the each group the teams played a double round-robin to decide their league table positions. Two points were awarded for a win and one point was awarded for a draw. Four teams qualified for the championship play-offs.

The first placed team in the group at the end of the qualification stage qualified for the play-offs. The second placed team from both groups played a decider to enter and the second-tier champions also qualified for the play-off group, which was contested as a single round robin. The winners of the play-off were awarded the Swiss championship title. The last placed team in each qualification group was relegated to the 1933–34 1. Liga. The two group winners in the second-tier, 1. Liga, would both achieve promotion this season.

=== Challenge National ===
Curiosity this season was that, during the Nationalliga winter break from November to February an intermediate championship was played. This was named Challenge National. Each team from one group played a single round-robin against the teams from the other group. Then the two group winners played a final.

== Nationalliga ==
=== Group 1 ===
==== Teams, locations ====
Team	Based in	Canton	Stadium	Capacity
FC Basel	Basel	Basel-Stadt	Landhof	4,000
FC Biel-Bienne	Biel/Bienne	Bern	Stadion Gurzelen	5,500
Étoile Carouge FC	Carouge	Geneva	Stade de la Fontenette	3,690
Grasshopper Club Zürich	Zürich	Zürich	Hardturm	20,000
FC La Chaux-de-Fonds	La Chaux-de-Fonds	Neuchâtel	Centre Sportif de la Charrière	12,700
FC Lugano	Lugano	Ticino	Cornaredo Stadium	6,330
Urania Genève Sport	Genève	Geneva	Stade de Frontenex	4,000
FC Young Fellows	Zürich	Zürich	Utogrund	2,850

==== League table ====
Pos	Team	Pld	W	D	L	GF	GA	GD	Pts	Qualification or relegation
1	Grasshopper Club	14	10	3	1	56	26	+30	23	Qualified for play-offs
2	Basel	14	7	4	3	42	29	+13	18	To decider for play-offs
3	Lugano	14	6	4	4	18	16	+2	16	
4	La Chaux-de-Fonds	14	7	1	6	19	15	+4	15	
5	Urania Genève Sport	14	5	2	7	32	32	0	12	
6	Young Fellows Zürich	14	5	2	7	29	29	0	12	
7	Biel-Bienne	14	6	0	8	29	45	−16	12	
8	Étoile Carouge	14	1	2	11	15	48	−33	4	Relegated to 1933–34 Swiss 1. Liga

Source: rsssf.com
Rules for classification: 1) Points; 2) Goal difference within the league, however with play-off for qualifiers;

==== Results ====
Home \ Away	BAS	BIE	ÉTO	CDF	GCZ	LUG	UGS	YFZ
Basel		6–2	6–3	4–1	3–3	1–1	4–2	7–0
Biel-Bienne	6–3		3–2	4–1	1–7	3–1	0–3	4–0
Étoile Carouge	1–1	0–1		3–0	2–2	1–4	2–4	4–0
La Chaux-de-Fonds	2–3	2–1	4–1		0–4	1–1	3–0	1–0
Grasshopper Club	7–1	5–3	3–0	3–2		5–2	4–4	3–1
Lugano	1–0	4–1	1–0	0–1	1–0		1–0	1–1
Urania	1–4	5–1	8–0	0–2	2–7	0–0		3–1
Young Fellows	2–2	1–3	2–0	1–4	2–3	2–0	5–0	

Source: rsssf.com
Legend: Blue = home team win; Yellow = draw; Red = away team win.

=== Group 2 ===
==== Teams, locations ====
Team	Based in	Canton	Stadium	Capacity
FC Aarau	Aarau	Aargau	Stadion Brügglifeld	9,240
FC Blue Stars Zürich	Zürich	Zürich	Hardhof	1,000
FC Concordia Basel	Basel	Basel-Stadt	Stadion Rankhof	7,000
FC Lausanne-Sport	Lausanne	Vaud	Pontaise	15,700
FC Nordstern Basel	Basel	Basel-Stadt	Rankhof	7,600
Servette FC	Geneva	Geneva	Stade des Charmilles	27,000
BSC Young Boys	Bern	Bern	Wankdorf Stadium	56,000
FC Zürich	Zürich	Zürich	Letzigrund	25,000

==== League table ====
Pos	Team	Pld	W	D	L	GF	GA	GD	Pts	Qualification
1	Young Boys	14	10	3	1	40	17	+23	23	To decider for group winners
2	Servette	14	10	3	1	46	15	+31	23	To decider for group winners
3	Lausanne Sports	14	8	4	2	33	17	+16	20	
4	Concordia	14	6	3	5	30	22	+8	15	
5	Zürich	14	4	5	5	30	26	+4	13	
6	Blue Stars	14	3	2	9	20	33	−13	8	
7	Nordstern	14	3	2	9	27	49	−22	8	
8	Aarau	14	0	2	12	12	59	−47	2	Relegated to 1933–34 Swiss 1. Liga

Source: rsssf.com
Rules for classification: 1) Points; 2) Goal difference within the league, however with play-off for qualifiers;

==== Results ====
Home \ Away	AAR	BSZ	CON	LS	NOR	SER	YB	ZÜR
Aarau		0–3	2–4	0–5	1–1	2–2	2–3	2–10
Blue Stars	3–0		2–3	1–2	2–2	2–4	2–4	2–0
Concordia	4–1	3–1		0–0	4–1	2–3	1–1	3–0
Lausanne-Sports	4–1	4–1	1–0		7–3	0–2	5–2	1–1
Nordstern	5–1	3–0	2–6	0–2		0–9	3–4	1–3
Servette	6–0	8–2	1–0	0–0	6–2		1–1	6–0
Young Boys	3–0	3–1	1–0	4–0	4–1	6–0		3–1
Zürich	6–0	0–0	3–3	2–2	3–1	0–1	1–1	

Source: rsssf.com
Legend: Blue = home team win; Yellow = draw; Red = away team win.

==== Decider for group winners ====
Because Young Boys and Servette ended the qualification stage level on points in joint first position a decider for the group winners was required. This match was played at the Pontaise on 14 May 1933.

14 May 1933

Young Boys	2–1	Servette
Hochsträsser 10'; Schott 83'	Servette summary	77' (pen.) Tax

Pontaise, Lausanne

Young Boys won and as group winners qualified for the championship play-offs. Servette were classed as second position in the group and continued to the decider for the play-offs between the two second placed teams.

=== Championship play-off ===
==== Decider for play-offs ====
28 May 1933
15:00
Match between 2nd of both groups

Basel	3–4	Servette FC Genève
Haftl 46' (1:3); Haftl 56' (2:3); Haftl 89' (3:4)	FCB report	21' (0:1) Kielholz; 28' (0:2) L'Hote; 38' (0:3) Tax; 75' (2:4) Amado

Stadion Rankhof, Basel
Attendance: 7,000
Referee: (Switzerland) Enderli (Winterthur)

==== Championship group ====
Pos	Team	Pld	W	D	L	GF	GA	GD	Pts	Qualification	SER	GCZ	YB	BER
1	Servette	3	2	1	0	9	1	+8	5	Play-off for championship	—	—	1–0	7–0
2	Grasshopper Club	3	2	1	0	8	5	+3	5	Play-off for championship	1–1	—	4–2	—
3	Young Boys	3	1	0	2	5	5	0	2		—	—	—	3–0
4	Bern	3	0	0	3	2	13	−11	0		—	2–3	—	—

Source: rsssf.com
Rules for classification: 1) Points; 2) Goal difference; 3) Goals scored; 4) Head-to-head points; 5) Away goals scored; 6) Draw.

==== Championship final ====
Because Grasshopper Club and Servette ended the play-off group level on points in joint first position a decider for the championship was required. This final was played at the Stadion Neufeld on 2 July 1933.

2 July 1933

Servette	3–2	Grasshopper Club
Amado 17'; Tax 30'; Amado 72'	Servette summary	40' Baumgartner; 47' Max Abegglen

Stadion Neufeld, Bern

Servette won and were awarded championship title. This was their seventh championship title to this date.

== Challenge National ==
=== Group 1 ===
Pos	Team	Pld	W	D	L	GF	GA	GD	Pts	Qualification or relegation
1	Grasshopper Club	8	7	0	1	41	6	+35	14	Advance to final
2	Urania Genève Sport	8	6	1	1	37	11	+26	13	
3	FC Lugano	8	6	1	1	21	12	+9	13	
4	Biel-Bienne	8	5	1	2	16	8	+8	11	
5	Basel	7	3	2	2	20	14	+6	8	
6	Young Fellows	8	4	0	4	18	15	+3	8	
7	La Chaux-de-Fonds	7	2	3	2	24	18	+6	7	
8	Étoile Carouge	8	0	5	3	11	14	−3	5	

Source: rsssf.com
Rules for classification: 1) Points; 2) Goal difference within the league, however with play-off for qualifiers;

=== Group 2 ===
Pos	Team	Pld	W	D	L	GF	GA	GD	Pts	Qualification or relegation
1	Young Boys	8	5	3	0	23	12	+11	13	Advance to final
2	Servette	8	4	2	2	14	10	+4	10	
3	Lausanne-Sport	8	2	2	4	16	30	−14	6	
4	Nordstern	8	2	1	5	18	31	−13	5	
5	Concordia	8	1	2	5	5	19	−14	4	
6	Blue Stars	7	1	1	5	7	20	−13	3	
7	Zürich	7	1	1	5	7	22	−15	3	
8	Aarau	8	0	1	7	8	44	−36	1	

Source: rsssf.com
Rules for classification: 1) Points; 2) Goal difference within the league, however with play-off for qualifiers;

Note: Blue Stars–Basel and Zürich–La Chaux-de-Fonds were not played.

=== Final ===
28 May 1933

Young Boys	2–1	Grasshopper Club
Aellig; O'Neill		25' André Abegglen

Wankdorf Stadium, Bern

== Further in Swiss football ==
- 1932–33 Swiss Cup
- 1932–33 Swiss 1. Liga

== Sources ==
- Switzerland 1932–33 at RSSSF

Preceded by 1931–32	Nationalliga seasons in Switzerland	Succeeded by 1933–34
