= 1930–31 Swiss Serie A =

Swiss football season

Nationalliga
- Season: 1930–31
- Dates: 24 August 1930 to 28 June 1931
- Champions: Grasshopper Club; Group West; Urania Genève Sport; Group Central; Young Boys; Group East; Grasshopper Club
- Relegated: Group West; Lausanne-Sport; FC Cantonal Neuchâtel; FC Fribourg; Group Central; Concordia; Solothurn; Grenchen; Group East; SC Brühl; Winterthur; Chiasso
- Matches: 3x 82 and 1 decider plus 12 play-offs

The following is the summary of the Swiss Nationalliga in the 1930–31 football season. This was the 34th season of top-tier football in Switzerland.

== Overview ==
=== Preamble ===
At this time, there was a major crisis taking place in Swiss football. There were disagreements between smaller and larger clubs. The smaller clubs wanted direct promotion without going through play-offs, while the larger clubs were insisting on separating the championship from the lower leagues, in a system similar to that which had already been implemented in Italy in 1922. Eventually, after various discussions, the Swiss Football Association (ASF/SFV) reached a compromis that remains without any sporting logic. A new First League was born and the old Promotion and Serie B become Second and Third league for this one season.

=== Format ===
Due to the differences, the past season had seen no promotions or relegations. The top-tier had the same 27 club members. As in the previous season, these were divided into three regional groups. However, the new championship regulations divided the season into two stages. During the first stage, within the each group the teams played a single round-robin to decide their league table positions. Two points were awarded for a win and one point was awarded for a draw.

For the second stage, each top-tier group had two additional teams from the lower division. The three regional champions from the past season Monthey, Luzern and Locarno, that had been rejected an automatic promotion, now received a mid-season promotion. In addition, the first classified teams in each of the six sub-regional second-tier groups, competed a play-off to decide three more mid-season promotions. Racing Club Lausanne, Black Stars Basel and Wohlen were these three play-off winners. In these larger groups, the teams played another single round-robin.

At the end of the championship, two rankings were drawn up. For the teams competing for the championship title, all games from both first and second stages were considered. For the relegation, only the games of the second stage were considered. A total of six teams qualified for the championship play-offs, these were the first two placed teams in each group. The top six teams in each group qualified for the new 1931–32 Nationalliga and all other teams were to contest in the newly created 1931–32 1. Liga.

== Serie A (First League) ==
The first stage of league season began with the first matchday on 24 August 1930 and was completed on 21 December with one rescheduled match which was played on 28 December. The second stage began on 4 January 1931, but in each group one fixture was played earlier. The second stage was completed by 31 May with a few rescheduled fixtures being played later. The final stage began on 10 May and completed by 28 June 1931.

=== Group West ===
==== Teams, locations ====
Team	Based in	Canton	Stadium	Capacity
FC Biel-Bienne	Biel/Bienne	Bern	Stadion Gurzelen	15,000
FC Cantonal Neuchâtel	Neuchâtel	Neuchâtel	Stade de la Maladière	25,500
Étoile Carouge FC	Carouge	Geneva	Stade de la Fontenette	3,690
FC Étoile-Sporting	La Chaux-de-Fonds	Neuchâtel	Les Foulets / Terrain des Eplatures	1,000 / 500
FC Fribourg	Fribourg	Fribourg	Stade Universitaire	9,000
FC La Chaux-de-Fonds	La Chaux-de-Fonds	Neuchâtel	Centre Sportif de la Charrière	10,000
FC Lausanne-Sport	Lausanne	Vaud	Pontaise	15,700
Racing Club Lausanne	Lausanne	Vaud	Centre sportif de la Tuilière	1,000
FC Monthey	Monthey	Valais	Stade Philippe Pottier	1,800
Servette FC	Geneva	Geneva	Stade des Charmilles	27,000
Urania Genève Sport	Genève	Geneva	Stade de Frontenex	4,000

==== League table ====
Pos	Team	Pld	W	D	L	GF	GA	GD	Pts	Qualification or relegation
1	Urania Genève Sport	18	12	4	2	62	17	+45	28	Qualified for final round
2	La Chaux-de-Fonds	18	12	3	3	58	19	+39	27	Qualified for final round
3	Biel-Bienne	18	12	1	5	57	25	+32	25	Qualified for 1931–32 Nationalliga
4	Etoile Carouge	18	10	3	5	49	30	+19	23	Qualified for 1931–32 Nationalliga
5	Servette	18	9	2	7	49	32	+17	20	Qualified for 1931–32 Nationalliga
6	Étoile-Sporting	18	7	3	8	36	49	−13	17	Qualified for 1931–32 Nationalliga
7	Lausanne-Sport	18	6	1	11	25	42	−17	13	Relegated to 1931–32 1. Liga
8	Cantonal Neuchâtel	18	4	4	10	24	43	−19	12	Relegated to 1931–32 1. Liga
9	Fribourg	18	2	5	11	22	66	−44	9	Relegated to 1931–32 1. Liga
10	Racing Club Lausanne	10	2	2	6	19	42	−23	6	Relegated to 1931–32 1. Liga
11	Monthey	10	1	0	9	10	46	−36	2	Relegated to 1931–32 1. Liga

Source: rsssf.com
Rules for classification: 1) Points; 2) Goal difference within the league, however with play-off for qualifiers;

==== Results ====
Home \ Away	BIE	CAN	CDF	ÉTC	ÉTS	FRI	LS	MON	RAC	SER	UGS
Biel-Bienne		7–1	0–3	2–0	7–1	5–1	4–1	–	4–1	0–1	2–2
Cantonal Neuchâtel	1–2		2–5	1–2	1–1	0–4	1–1	–	1–3	3–0	1–0
La Chaux-de-Fonds	3–1	4–1		3–1	3–1	3–0	4–2	9–0	–	3–0	1–2
Étoile Carouge	3–0	4–0	2–1		7–0	2–2	4–0	–	5–1	1–4	0–4
Étoile-Sporting	0–5	–	1–1	1–4		4–1	2–3	–	3–3	4–1	1–2
Fribourg	2–5	1–1	0–0	3–3	2–7		0–3	1–3	–	0–4	2–5
Lausanne-Sports	1–2	1–3	0–4	3–2	0–1	1–2		3–0	–	0–3	0–4
Monthey	2–9	0–4	–	0–2	1–2	–	–		–	–	1–10
Racing Lausanne	–	–	5–11	–	–	0–0	1–3	2–1		3–8	–
Servette	1–2	1–1	1–0	2–4	2–4	12–0	4–1	4–1	–		1–1
Urania	1–0	5–1	0–0	3–3	5–1	8–1	0–2	–	6–0	4–0	

Source: rsssf.com
Legend: Blue = home team win; Yellow = draw; Red = away team win.

=== Group Central ===
==== Teams, locations ====
Team	Based in	Canton	Stadium	Capacity
FC Aarau	Aarau	Aargau	Stadion Brügglifeld	9,240
FC Basel	Basel	Basel-Stadt	Landhof	4,000
FC Bern	Bern	Bern	Stadion Neufeld	14,000
FC Black Stars Basel	Basel	Basel-Stadt	Buschwilerhof	1,200
FC Concordia Basel	Basel	Basel-Stadt	Stadion Rankhof	7,000
FC Grenchen	Grenchen	Solothurn	Stadium Brühl	15,100
FC Luzern	Lucerne	Lucerne	Stadion Allmend	25,000
FC Nordstern Basel	Basel	Basel-Stadt	Rankhof	7,600
BSC Old Boys	Basel	Basel-Stadt	Stadion Schützenmatte	8,000
FC Solothurn	Solothurn	Solothurn	Stadion FC Solothurn	6,750
BSC Young Boys	Bern	Bern	Wankdorf Stadium	56,000

==== League table ====
Pos	Team	Pld	W	D	L	GF	GA	GD	Pts	Qualification or relegation
1	Young Boys	18	12	2	4	44	21	+23	26	Qualified for final round
2	Basel	18	11	2	5	48	28	+20	24	To decider for second place
3	Nordstern	18	11	2	5	49	23	+26	24	To decider for second place
4	Old Boys	18	9	3	6	36	35	+1	21	Qualified for 1931–32 Nationalliga
5	Aarau	18	9	2	7	38	37	+1	20	Qualified for 1931–32 Nationalliga
6	Bern	18	6	3	9	34	33	+1	15	Qualified for 1931–32 Nationalliga
7	Concordia	18	5	3	10	25	46	−21	13	Relegated to 1931–32 1. Liga
8	Solothurn	18	4	5	9	26	40	−14	13	Relegated to 1931–32 1. Liga
9	Luzern	10	4	3	3	16	14	+2	11	Relegated to 1931–32 1. Liga
10	Grenchen	18	5	1	12	39	59	−20	11	Relegated to 1931–32 1. Liga
11	Black Stars	10	1	2	7	12	31	−19	4	Relegated to 1931–32 1. Liga

Source: rsssf.com
Rules for classification: 1) Points; 2) Goal difference within the league, however with play-off for qualifiers;

==== Decider for second place ====
FC Nordstern Basel and FC Basel ended the season level on points in joint second/third position. Because the second place was the qualifying slot for the final round a decider was required. The decider match for second place was played on 17 May 1931 at the Stadion Schützenmatte in Basel.

Team 1	Score	Team 2
Basel	2–1	Nordstern

Basel won and advanced to the championship play-offs. Nordstern were qualified for 1931–32 Nationalliga.

==== Results ====
Home \ Away	AAR	BAS	BER	BSB	CON	GRE	LUZ	NOR	OBB	SOL	YB
Aarau		4–3	0–2	2–4	1–1	2–1	–	2–1	0–1	4–3	2–1
Basel	3–1		2–1	–	3–0	4–0	2–2	2–0	0–1	2–1	3–1
Bern	1–2	1–3		4–1	4–0	5–2	–	1–2	4–1	1–1	0–3
Black Stars	–	1–7	–		–	1–1	0–2	1–3	–	–	1–3
Concordia	3–3	1–4	3–2	3–1		2–0	–	0–4	2–3	–	3–2
Grenchen	2–4	3–2	4–2	–	7–1		2–3	1–5	1–2	2–3	2–4
Luzern	1–4	–	1–2	–	2–0	–		–	1–1	1–1	–
Nordstern	4–0	5–0	3–2		1–1	11–1	0–2		3–0	4–2	0–2
Old Boys	5–3	2–2	3–2	4–0	1–4	–	–	1–1		3–0	0–6
Solothurn	0–2	4–2	0–0	2–2	2–1	1–2	–	0–2	1–5		1–1
Young Boys	1–0	0–3	1–1	–	1–0	5–3	2–1	4–0	1–0	6–1	

Source: rsssf.com
Legend: Blue = home team win; Yellow = draw; Red = away team win.

=== Group East ===
==== Teams, locations ====
Team	Based in	Canton	Stadium	Capacity
FC Blue Stars Zürich	Zürich	Zürich	Hardhof	1,000
SC Brühl	St. Gallen	St. Gallen	Paul-Grüninger-Stadion	4,200
FC Chiasso	Chiasso	Ticino	Stadio Comunale Riva IV	4,000
Grasshopper Club Zürich	Zürich	Zürich	Hardturm	20,000
FC Locarno	Locarno	Ticino	Stadio comunale Lido	5,000
FC Lugano	Lugano	Ticino	Cornaredo Stadium	6,330
FC St. Gallen	St. Gallen	St. Gallen	Espenmoos	11,000
FC Winterthur	Winterthur	Zürich	Schützenwiese	8,550
FC Wohlen	Wohlen	Aargau	Stadion Niedermatten	3,000
FC Young Fellows	Zürich	Zürich	Utogrund	2,850
FC Zürich	Zürich	Zürich	Letzigrund	25,000

==== League table ====
Pos	Team	Pld	W	D	L	GF	GA	GD	Pts	Qualification or relegation
1	Grasshopper Club	18	15	1	2	73	26	+47	31	Qualified for final round
2	Blue Stars	18	12	1	5	53	30	+23	25	Qualified for final round
3	Lugano	18	11	1	6	57	20	+37	23	Qualified for 1931–32 Nationalliga
4	Young Fellows	18	10	2	6	54	38	+16	22	Qualified for 1931–32 Nationalliga
5	Zürich	18	8	3	7	35	34	+1	19	Qualified for 1931–32 Nationalliga
6	St. Gallen	18	7	1	10	35	47	−12	15	Qualified for 1931–32 Nationalliga
7	SC Brühl	18	5	3	10	34	48	−14	13	Relegated to 1931–32 1. Liga
8	Locarno	10	6	0	4	23	22	+1	12	Relegated to 1931–32 1. Liga
9	Winterthur	18	3	4	11	21	64	−43	10	Relegated to 1931–32 1. Liga
10	Chiasso	18	4	1	13	30	55	−25	9	Relegated to 1931–32 1. Liga
11	Wohlen	10	1	1	8	11	42	−31	3	Relegated to 1931–32 1. Liga

Source: rsssf.com
Rules for classification: 1) Points; 2) Goal difference within the league, however with play-off for qualifiers;

==== Results ====
Home \ Away	BSZ	BRÜ	CHI	GCZ	LOC	LUG	STG	WIN	WOH	YFZ	ZÜR
Blue Stars		4–1	6–1	0–3	0–1	0–5	1–0	9–2	–	4–2	2–1
Brühl	1–5		7–1	2–3	4–2	1–5	0–2	1–1	–	4–4	2–4
Chiasso	2–3	2–1		1–2	0–1	0–2	8–3	2–2	–	1–0	1–4
Grasshopper Club	2–3	4–1	5–2		–	3–1	7–2	6–1	–	3–3	6–2
Locarno	–	–	–	1–2		1–5	2–1	–	5–1	–	3–0
Lugano	3–0	2–3	3–1	1–3	–		7–0	5–0	2–0	2–3	0–1
St. Gallen	1–0	4–0	4–3	–	–	1–3		1–0	5–0	1–2	3–1
Winterthur	1–5	1–2	2–1	1–5	2–5	0–9	3–3		–	2–4	0–0
Wohlen	2–8	1–1	2–5	–	–	–	–	1–0		1–3	–
Young Fellows	1–2	2–3	4–1	0–4	7–3	2–1	6–1	6–0	–		2–1
Zürich	1–1	6–2	5–1	1–3	–	1–1	4–2	0–2	4–2	4–3	

Source: rsssf.com
Legend: Blue = home team win; Yellow = draw; Red = away team win.

=== Championship round ===
The final stage, championship round, began on 10 May and completed by 28 June 1931. The format here was that each team here played once against each other team from the other regional groups.

==== Final league table ====
Pos	Team	Pld	W	D	L	GF	GA	GD	Pts	Qualification
1	Grasshopper Club	4	3	1	0	12	2	+10	7	Swiss champions
2	Urania Genève Sport	4	2	2	0	8	5	+3	6	
3	La Chaux-de-Fonds	4	2	0	2	10	8	+2	4	
4	Blue Stars	4	1	1	2	9	9	0	3	
5	Basel	4	1	1	2	7	11	−4	3	
6	Young Boys	4	0	1	3	4	15	−11	1	

Source: rsssf.com
Rules for classification: 1) Points; 2) Goal difference within the league, however with play-off for qualifiers;

==== Results ====
Team 1	Score	Team 2
10 May 1931
Blue Stars	2–0	Chaux-de-Fonds
Young Boys	1–3	Urania
17 May 1931
Grasshopper Club	3–0	Young Boys
Urania	3–2	Blue Stars
31 May 1931
Basel	2–2	Urania
Grasshopper Club	5–1	La Chaux-de-Fonds
Young Boys	3–3	Blue Stars
7 June 1931
Basel	1–4	Grasshopper Club
Chaux-de-Fonds	6–0	Young Boys
21 June 1931
La Chaux-de-Fonds	3–1	Basel
28 June 1931
Blue Stars	2–3	Basel
Urania	0–0	Grasshopper Club

Grasshopper Club won the play-offs and were awarded the championship title. This was the club's seventh championship title to this date.

== Further in Swiss football ==
- 1931–32 Swiss Cup

== Sources ==
- Switzerland 1930–31 at RSSSF

Preceded by 1929–30	Nationalliga seasons in Switzerland	Succeeded by 1931–32
