= 1931–32 Swiss 1. Liga =

1. Liga
- Season: 1931–32
- Champions: 1. Liga champions: Lausanne-Sport; Group West winners: Lausanne-Sport; Group East winners: Concordia
- Promoted: Lausanne-Sport; Concordia
- Relegated: Group West; Monthey; Stade Lausanne; Fribourg; Group East; Black Stars; Wohlen; FC Chiasso
- Matches: twice 72 plus 2 play-off finals

The 1931–32 1. Liga season was the initial season of the 1. Liga. At the time of its creation, and from here onwards, the 1. Liga became the new second-tier of the Swiss football league system.

== Overview ==
=== Preamble ===
The league system had suffered a major crisis during the previous years. There had been disagreements between smaller and larger clubs. The smaller clubs wanted direct promotion without going through play-offs, while the larger clubs were insisting on separating the championship from the lower leagues, in a system similar to that which had already been implemented in Italy in 1922. After various discussions, the Swiss Football Association (ASF/SFV) reached a compromise and modified the formats in the football league system. Last season the top-tier (which had been called Serie A) had 33 Clubs, which had been divided into three regional groups. From here onwards, the top-tier was now named Nationalliga and the number of clubs had been reduced. This season the top-tier had only 18 teams, which were divided into two groups and in the following season would be reduced to 16 clubs, also in two groups. From the 1933–34 Nationalliga season the Nationalliga would be contested in one national division with 16 clubs.

This season a new second division had been created, called 1. Liga, with 18 teams. The former second-tier, which had been 54 teams in 6 regional groups, called 2. Liga or earlier Serie Promotion, now became the third-tier. The season was played from the end of August 1931 to the beginning of May 1932, with a few rescheduled games being played during May. The Swiss championship play-off took place from 29 May to 26 June 1932.

=== Format ===
The 18 clubs were divided into two regional groups, each with 9 teams. The teams in each group competed a double round-robin to decide their league position. Two points were awarded for a win and one point was awarded for a draw. Both group winners were promoted to the top-tier Nationalliga, but they contested a final to decide the title of 1. Liga champions. Curiously the 1. Liga Champions were automatically qualified for the final round of the Nationalliga. There were six relegations this season, the last three placed teams in each group were directly relegated to the 2. Liga (third tier).

== Group West ==
=== Teams, locations ===
Club	Based in	Canton	Stadium	Capacity
FC Cantonal Neuchâtel	Neuchâtel	Neuchâtel	Stade de la Maladière	25,500
FC Fribourg	Fribourg	Fribourg	Stade Universitaire	9,000
FC Grenchen	Grenchen	Solothurn	Stadium Brühl	15,100
FC Lausanne-Sport	Lausanne	Vaud	Pontaise	15,700
FC Monthey	Monthey	Valais	Stade Philippe Pottier	1,800
FC Olten	Olten	Solothurn	Sportanlagen Kleinholz	8,000
Racing Club Lausanne	Lausanne	Vaud	Centre sportif de la Tuilière	1,000
FC Solothurn	Solothurn	Solothurn	Stadion FC Solothurn	6,750
FC Stade Lausanne	Ouchy, Lausanne	Vaud	Centre sportif de Vidy	1,000

=== League table ===
Pos	Team	Pld	W	D	L	GF	GA	GD	Pts	Qualification or relegation
1	FC Lausanne-Sport	16	13	0	3	62	23	+39	26	Promotion to 1932–33 Nationalliga, to play-off for title
2	FC Grenchen	16	9	2	5	34	25	+9	20	
3	FC Olten	16	9	2	5	36	30	+6	20	
4	Racing Club Lausanne	16	7	4	5	45	36	+9	18	
5	FC Solothurn	16	8	1	7	36	34	+2	17	
6	FC Cantonal Neuchâtel	16	7	2	7	39	34	+5	16	
7	FC Fribourg	16	3	5	8	23	40	−17	11	Relegation to 2. Liga
8	FC Stade Lausanne	16	5	1	10	30	54	−24	11	Relegation to 2. Liga
9	FC Monthey	16	1	3	12	14	43	−29	5	Relegation to 2. Liga

Source: RSSSF
Rules for classification: 1) Points; 2) Goal difference within the league, but decider play-off for qualifiers.

== Group East ==
=== Teams, locations ===
Club	Based in	Canton	Stadium	Capacity
FC Black Stars Basel	Basel	Basel-Stadt	Buschwilerhof	1,200
SC Brühl	St. Gallen	St. Gallen	Paul-Grüninger-Stadion	4,200
FC Chiasso	Chiasso	Ticino	Stadio Comunale Riva IV	4,000
FC Concordia Basel	Basel	Basel-Stadt	Stadion Rankhof	7,000
FC Locarno	Locarno	Ticino	Stadio comunale Lido	5,000
FC Luzern	Lucerne	Lucerne	Stadion Allmend	25,000
FC Oerlikon	Oerlikon (Zürich)	Zürich	Sportanlage Neudorf	1,000
FC Winterthur	Winterthur	Zürich	Schützenwiese	8,550
FC Wohlen	Wohlen	Aargau	Stadion Niedermatten	3,000

=== League table ===
Pos	Team	Pld	W	D	L	GF	GA	GD	Pts	Qualification or relegation
1	FC Concordia Basel	16	11	2	3	54	23	+31	24	Promotion to 1932–33 Nationalliga, to play-off for title
2	SC Brühl	16	10	2	4	33	16	+17	22	
3	FC Locarno	16	10	1	5	43	21	+22	21	
4	FC Luzern	16	6	3	7	34	28	+6	15	
5	FC Oerlikon	16	7	1	8	31	42	−11	15	
6	FC Winterthur	16	6	2	8	26	36	−10	14	
7	FC Black Stars Basel	16	6	1	9	19	36	−17	13	Relegation to 2. Liga
8	FC Wohlen	16	5	1	10	23	42	−19	11	Relegation to 2. Liga
9	FC Chiasso	16	4	1	11	21	40	−19	9	Relegation to 2. Liga

Source: RSSSF
Rules for classification: 1) Points; 2) Goal difference within the league, but decider play-off for qualifiers.

== Championship final ==
The two group winners had achieved direct promotion to the 1932–33 Nationalliga. They now competed a play off for the title of 1. Liga champions and the qualification to the final round of the Nationalliga. The match was played on 22 May 1932 at the Stadion Neufeld in Bern.

Team 1	Score	Team 2
Concordia	2–2	Lausanne-Sport

The match was drawn after 90 minutes. Because no extra time had been agreed a replay was required. The replay took place one week later, on 29 May, at the Pontaise in Lausanne.

Team 1	Score	Team 2
Lausanne-Sport	4–1	Concordia

Lausanne-Sport won and became the 1. Liga championship title and qualified for the top-tier final round. Because Lausanne-Sports won the play-off final, the curiosity of the season had occurred, the winners of the very first 1. Liga season also became Swiss champions. This was the first and only time that a team from the second-tier won the championship title. This was the clubs second championship title to this date.

== Further in Swiss football ==
- 1931–32 Nationalliga
- 1931–32 Swiss Cup

== Sources ==
- Switzerland 1931–32 at RSSSF

Preceded by —	Seasons in Swiss 1. Liga	Succeeded by 1932–33
