= Daniel Ançay =

Swiss footballer (born 1970)

Personal information
- Date of birth: 25 July 1970 (age 56)
- Height: 1.90 m (6 ft 3 in)
- Position: Goalkeeper

Senior career*
Years	Team	Apps	(Gls)
1992–2000	FC Sion		
1995–1996	→ FC Monthey (loan)		
2000–2002	AC Bellinzona		
2002–2004	FC Sion		
2004–2005	FC Savièse		
- * Club domestic league appearances and goals

Daniel Ançay (born 25 July 1970) is a retired Swiss football goalkeeper.
