= Edmond Loichot =

Swiss footballer (1905–1989)

Personal information
- Position: Midfielder

Senior career*
Years	Team	Apps	(Gls)
1930–1932	Urania Genève Sport		
1932–1935	Servette FC		

International career
1930–1934	Switzerland	5	(0)
- * Club domestic league appearances and goals

Edmond Loichot (1905–1989) was a Swiss footballer who played as a midfielder for Switzerland in the 1934. He also played for Urania Genève Sport and Servette FC.
