= Milan Šimůnek =

Czech footballer (born 1962)

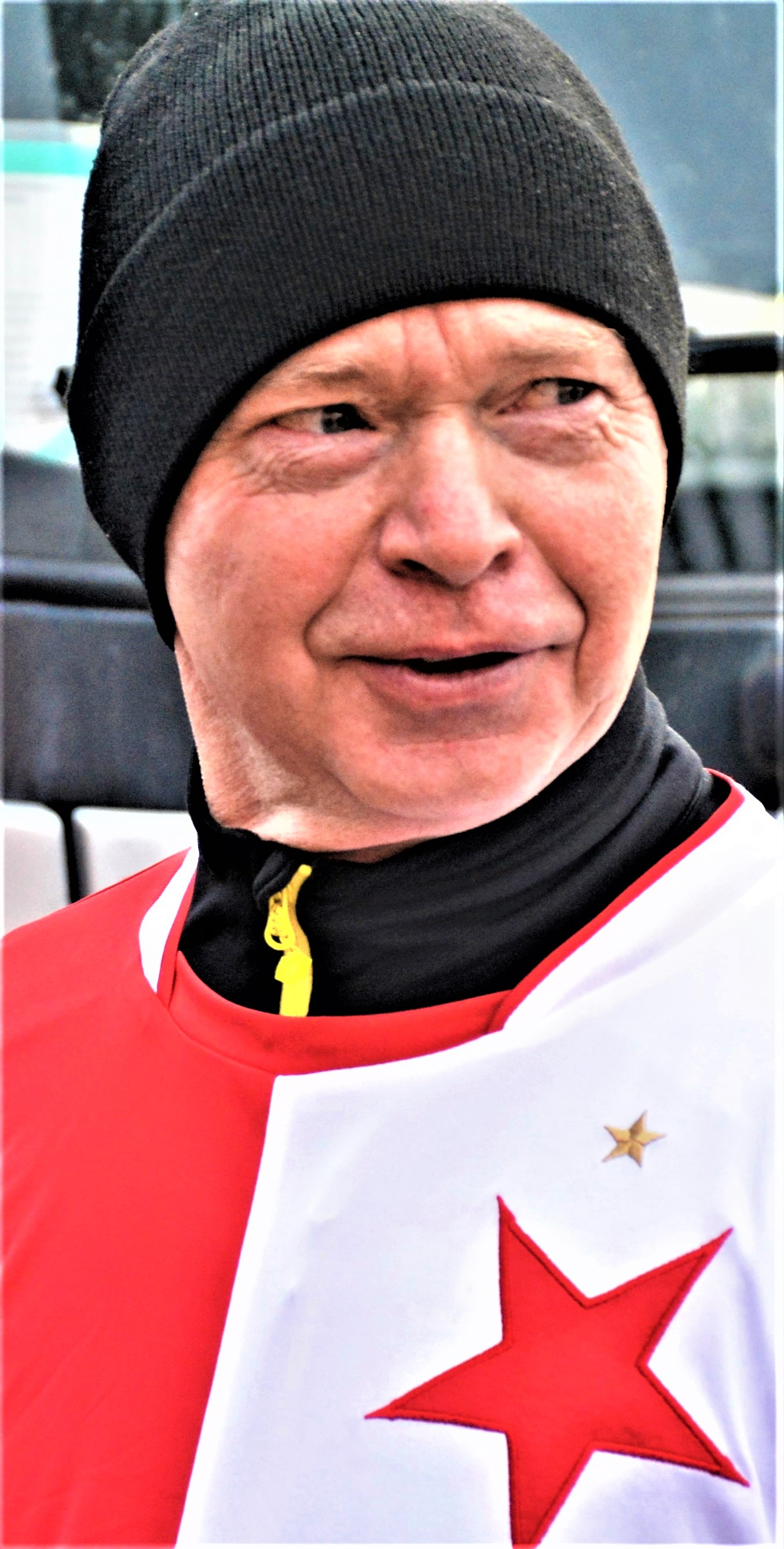
- 2018

Personal information
- Date of birth: 23 November 1962 (age 63)
- Place of birth: Czech Republic
- Position: Defender

Senior career*
Years	Team	Apps	(Gls)
1981–1982	VTJ Tábor	6	(0)
1983–1991	SK Slavia Prague	143	(7)
1991–1993	FC Châtel-St-Denis	60	(16)
1993–1994	FC Monthey	31	(7)
1994–1996	FC Winterthur	60	(5)
1997	SR Delémont		
- * Club domestic league appearances and goals

Milan Šimůnek (born 23 November 1962) is a Czech former footballer who played as a defender.

== Playing career ==
He started his career with Czech side VTJ Tábor. In 1983, he signed for Czech side SK Slavia Prague. He was regarded as one of the club's most important players. From 1991, he played in Switzerland. In 1991, he signed for FC Châtel-St-Denis, moving to FC Monthey in 1993. In 1994, he joined FC Winterthur, before going to SR Delémont in 1997.

== Post-playing career ==
After retiring from professional football, he lived in Switzerland. After that, he worked as a scout.

== Personal life ==
He has been married. He is the father of Czech footballer Jan Šimůnek.
