= Step over =

Terminology in association football

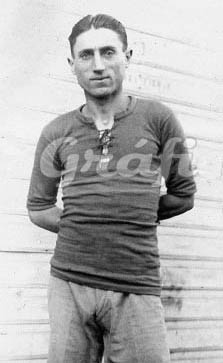
Argentine forward Pedro Calomino is regarded as the inventor of the step over movement

The step over (also known as the pedalada, the denílson, or the scissors, or the roeder shuffle) is a dribbling move, or feint, in association football, used to fool a defensive player into thinking the offensive player, in possession of the ball, is going to move in a direction they do not intend to move in.

According to several sources, the move was invented by Argentine winger Pedro Calomino in the 1910s Other Argentine player, Luis Indaco, became famous for the same skill during his career at Rosario Central in the 1920s and early 1930s.

The movement was first used in Europe by Dutch player Law Adam, who was famous for it in the late 1920s/early 1930s, which earned him the nickname "Adam the Scissorsman". It was later also used in Italy by Amedeo Biavati in the 1930s and was used by former Newcastle United player Glenn Roeder in the 1980s.

The step over was popularised in the mid-1990s by Brazilian footballer and global superstar Ronaldo. Nowadays, the technique is in widespread use by attacking players all over the world, such as Cristiano Ronaldo and Neymar.

== Source ==
Books

- Simpson, Paul (2013). Who Invented the Stepover?. Profile Books. ISBN 9781847658425.
