= Jan Šimůnek =

Czech footballer (born 1987)

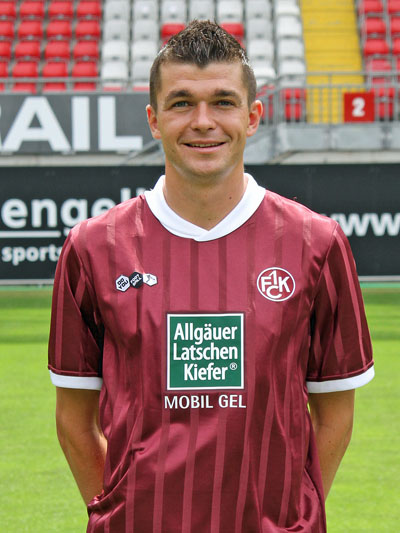
- Šimůnek with 1. FC Kaiserslautern

Personal information
- Full name: Jan Šimůnek
- Date of birth: 20 February 1987 (age 39)
- Place of birth: Prague, Czechoslovakia
- Height: 1.87 m (6 ft 2 in)
- Position: Defender

Youth career
- 1991–1993: Chatel St. Denis
- 1993–1994: FC Monthey
- 1994–1996: Hellas Winterthur
- 1996–1999: Bohemians Praha
- 1994–2004: Sparta Prague

Senior career*
Years	Team	Apps	(Gls)
2004–2006	Sparta Prague B	29	(0)
2005–2007	Sparta Prague	2	(0)
2006–2007	→ SK Kladno (loan)	29	(0)
2007–2010	VfL Wolfsburg	52	(0)
2008–2010	→ VfL Wolfsburg II	11	(1)
2010–2014	1. FC Kaiserslautern	34	(2)
2012–2013	→ 1. FC Kaiserslautern II	2	(0)
2014–2016	VfL Bochum	12	(0)
2016–2017	Dukla Prague	19	(0)
2017–2018	Vasas SC	2	(0)
Total		182	(3)

International career
2002–2003	Czech Republic U16	9	(0)
2003–2004	Czech Republic U17	8	(0)
2004–2006	Czech Republic U19	19	(1)
2006–2007	Czech Republic U20	9	(0)
2006–2008	Czech Republic U21	5	(0)
2009	Czech Republic	4	(0)
Medal record
VfL Wolfsburg
Winner	Bundesliga	2008–09
- * Club domestic league appearances and goals

Jan Šimůnek (born 20 February 1987 in Prague) is a Czech former professional footballer who played as a defender. He made four appearances for the Czech Republic national team. His father, Milan is a former footballer.

== Career ==
In 2017 Šimůnek joined Hungarian club Vasas SC.

== Career statistics ==
As of 29 July 2016

Appearances and goals by club, season and competition
Club	Season	League			Cup (Note: Includes Czech Cup, DFB-Pokal)		Continental		Total	
Club	Season	Division	Apps	Goals	Apps	Goals	Apps	Goals	Apps	Goals
Sparta Prague B	2004–05	Czech 2. Liga	4	0	—		—		4	0
Sparta Prague B	2005–06	Czech 2. Liga	25	0	—		—		25	0
Sparta Prague B	Total		29	0						
Sparta Prague	2004–05	Czech First League	1	0	0	0				
Sparta Prague	2005–06	Czech First League	0	0	0	0				
Sparta Prague	2007–08	Czech First League	1	0	0	0				
Sparta Prague	Total		2	0						
SK Kladno (loan)	2006–07	Czech First League	29	0			—			
VfL Wolfsburg	2007–08	Bundesliga	30	0	3	0	—		33	0
VfL Wolfsburg	2008–09	Bundesliga	17	0	2	0	3	0	22	0
VfL Wolfsburg	2009–10	Bundesliga	5	0	1	0	0	0	6	0
VfL Wolfsburg	Total		52	0	6	0	3	0	61	0
VfL Wolfsburg II	2008–09	Regionalliga Nord	8	1	—		—		8	1
VfL Wolfsburg II	2009–10	Regionalliga Nord	3	0	—		—		3	0
VfL Wolfsburg II	Total		11	1	0	0	0	0	11	1
1. FC Kaiserslautern	2010–11	Bundesliga	0	0	1	0	—		1	0
1. FC Kaiserslautern	2011–12	Bundesliga	6	0	0	0	—		6	0
1. FC Kaiserslautern	2012–13	2. Bundesliga	10	1	1	0	—		11	1
1. FC Kaiserslautern	2013–14	2. Bundesliga	18	1	4	0	—		22	1
1. FC Kaiserslautern	Total		34	2	6	0	0	0	40	2
1. FC Kaiserslautern II	2012–13	Regionalliga Südwest	2	0	—		—		2	0
VfL Bochum	2014–15	2. Bundesliga	6	0	1	0	—		7	0
VfL Bochum	2015–16	2. Bundesliga	6	0	2	0	—		8	0
VfL Bochum	Total		12	0	3!0	0	0	15	0	
Dukla Prague	2016–17	Czech First League	19	0	1	0	—		20	0
Career total			172	3						

== Honours ==
VfL Wolfsburg

- Bundesliga: 2008–09

Czech Republic U21

- FIFA U-20 World Cup: runner-up 2007
