= 1932–33 Swiss 1. Liga =

1. Liga
- Season: 1932–33
- Champions: 1. Liga champions: FC Bern; Group West winners: FC Bern; Group East winners: FC Locarno
- Promoted: FC Bern; FC Locarno
- Relegated: Group West; FC Montreux-Sports; FC Olten; Group East; Old Boys; FC Oerlikon
- Matches: twice 72 plus 1 play-off final

The 1932–33 1. Liga season was the second season of the 1. Liga since its creation in 1931. At this time, the 1. Liga was the second-tier of the Swiss football league system.

== Overview ==
=== Preamble ===
This season the Swiss Football Association (ASF/SFV) had 18 member clubs in the top-tier and 18 clubs in the second-tier. The third-tier was now governed regionally. The modifications in the football league system were continuing, but after the turmoils of the recent years, the moods had cooled considerably. The plan for next year was to reduce the membership of the top-tier by two clubs and to increase the size of the second-tier by four clubs in two years.

=== Format ===
There were 18 clubs that competed in the 1. Liga this season. The 18 clubs were divided into two regional groups, each with 9 teams. The teams in each group played a double round-robin to decide their league position. Two points were awarded for a win and one point was awarded for a draw. Both group winners were promoted to the top-tier Nationalliga, but they contested a final to decide the title of 1. Liga champions. Curiously the 1. Liga Champions were automatically qualified for the final round of the Nationalliga. However, this rule was abolished after this season. There were four relegations this season, the last two placed teams in each group were directly relegated to the 2. Liga (third tier).

=== Challenge of 1. Liga ===
Another curiosity this season was that, during the winter break from November to February an intermediate championship was played. This was named Challenge of 1. Liga. Each team from one group played five games against drawn teams from the other group. Then the two Challenge group winners played a final.

== Group West ==
=== Teams, locations ===
Club	Based in	Canton	Stadium	Capacity
FC Bern	Bern	Bern	Stadion Neufeld	14,000
US Bienne-Boujean	Biel/Bienne	Bern		
FC Cantonal Neuchâtel	Neuchâtel	Neuchâtel	Stade de la Maladière	25,500
FC Étoile-Sporting	La Chaux-de-Fonds	Neuchâtel	Les Foulets / Terrain des Eplatures	1,000 / 500
FC Grenchen	Grenchen	Solothurn	Stadium Brühl	15,100
FC Montreux-Sports	Montreux	Vaud	Stade de Chailly	1,000
FC Olten	Olten	Solothurn	Sportanlagen Kleinholz	8,000
Racing Club Lausanne	Lausanne	Vaud	Centre sportif de la Tuilière	1,000
FC Solothurn	Solothurn	Solothurn	Stadion FC Solothurn	6,750

=== Final league table ===
Pos	Team	Pld	W	D	L	GF	GA	GD	Pts	Qualification or relegation
1	FC Bern	16	14	1	1	52	14	+38	29	Promotion to 1933–34 Nationalliga, play-off for title
2	FC Grenchen	16	12	1	3	47	19	+28	25	
3	FC Étoile-Sporting	16	8	2	6	22	25	−3	18	
4	Racing Club Lausanne	16	8	1	7	43	40	+3	17	
5	FC Cantonal Neuchâtel	16	5	5	6	25	29	−4	15	
6	FC Solothurn	16	6	2	8	32	41	−9	14	
7	US Bienne-Boujean	16	4	2	10	27	45	−18	10	
8	FC Montreux-Sports	16	3	2	11	27	40	−13	8	Relegation to 2. Liga
9	FC Olten	16	3	2	11	27	49	−22	8	Relegation to 2. Liga

Source: RSSSF
Rules for classification: 1) Points; 2) Goal difference within the league, but decider play-off for qualifiers.

== Group East ==
=== Teams, locations ===
Club	Based in	Canton	Stadium	Capacity
AC Bellinzona	Bellinzona	Ticino	Stadio Comunale Bellinzona	5,000
SC Brühl	St. Gallen	St. Gallen	Paul-Grüninger-Stadion	4,200
FC Locarno	Locarno	Ticino	Stadio comunale Lido	5,000
FC Luzern	Lucerne	Lucerne	Stadion Allmend	25,000
FC Oerlikon	Oerlikon (Zürich)	Zürich	Sportanlage Neudorf	1,000
BSC Old Boys	Basel	Basel-Stadt	Stadion Schützenmatte	8,000
FC Seebach Zürich	Zürich	Zürich	Eichrain	1,000
FC St. Gallen	St. Gallen	St. Gallen	Espenmoos	11,000
FC Winterthur	Winterthur	Zürich	Schützenwiese	8,550

=== Final league table ===
Pos	Team	Pld	W	D	L	GF	GA	GD	Pts	Qualification or relegation
1	FC Locarno	16	12	2	2	58	20	+38	26	Promotion to 1933–34 Nationalliga, play-off for title
2	SC Brühl	16	11	3	2	34	17	+17	25	
3	FC Seebach Zürich	16	7	4	5	37	33	+4	18	
4	FC St. Gallen	16	6	4	6	29	28	+1	16	
5	AC Bellinzona	16	6	3	7	38	36	+2	15	
6	FC Winterthur	16	5	3	8	27	35	−8	13	
7	Luzern	16	4	5	7	25	33	−8	13	
8	BSC Old Boys	16	3	5	8	22	36	−14	11	Relegation to 2. Liga
9	FC Oerlikon	16	1	3	12	18	50	−32	5	Relegation to 2. Liga

Source: RSSSF
Rules for classification: 1) Points; 2) Goal difference within the league, but decider play-off for qualifiers.

== Championship final ==
The two group winners had achieved direct promotion to the 1934–35 Nationalliga. They now competed a play off for the title of 1. Liga champions and the qualification to the final round of the Nationalliga. The games was played on 14 May 1933 in Bern

Team 1	Score	Team 2
FC Bern	3–1	FC Locarno

FC Bern won the 1. Liga championship title and qualified for the top-tier final round.

== Challenge of 1. Liga ==
=== Group 1 ===
Pos	Team	Pld	W	D	L	GF	GA	GD	Pts	Qualification or relegation
1	FC Étoile-Sporting	5	4	1	0	0	0	0	9	Advance to final
2	FC Grenchen	5	4	0	1	0	0	0	8	
3	FC Montreux-Sports	5	3	1	1	0	0	0	7	
4	US Bienne-Boujean	5	3	1	1	0	0	0	7	
5	FC Olten	5	3	1	1	0	0	0	7	
6	FC Bern	5	2	1	2	0	0	0	5	
7	FC Solothurn	5	1	1	3	0	0	0	3	
8	FC Cantonal Neuchâtel	5	0	2	3	0	0	0	2	
9	Racing Club Lausanne	5	1	0	4	0	0	0	2	

Source: rsssf.com
Rules for classification: 1) Points; 2) Goal difference within the league, however with play-off for qualifiers;

=== Group 2 ===
Pos	Team	Pld	W	D	L	GF	GA	GD	Pts	Qualification or relegation
1	FC St. Gallen	5	2	1	2	0	0	0	5	Advance to final
2	FC Seebach Zürich	5	2	1	2	0	0	0	5	
3	FC Locarno	5	2	0	3	0	0	0	4	
4	FC Oerlikon	5	1	2	2	0	0	0	4	
5	Luzern	5	2	0	3	0	0	0	4	
6	BSC Old Boys	5	1	1	3	0	0	0	3	
7	FC Winterthur	5	0	3	2	0	0	0	3	
8	AC Bellinzona	5	1	0	4	0	0	0	2	
9	SC Brühl	5	1	0	4	0	0	0	2	

Source: rsssf.com
Rules for classification: 1) Points; 2) Goal difference within the league, however with play-off for qualifiers;

=== Final ===
The Challenge final was played on 14 May 1933 at the Espenmoos in St. Gallen.

Team 1	Score	Team 2
St. Gallen	4–5	Étoile-Sporting

== Further in Swiss football ==
- 1932–33 Nationalliga
- 1932–33 Swiss Cup

== Sources ==
- Switzerland 1932–33 at RSSSF

Preceded by 1931–32	Seasons in Swiss 1. Liga	Succeeded by 1933–34
