= Louis Gobet =

Swiss footballer (born 1908)

Personal information
- Date of birth: 28 October 1908
- Date of death: 1995 (aged 86–87)
- Position: Defender

Senior career*
| Years | Team | Apps | (Gls) |
- FC Blue Stars Zürich
- FC Bern 1894

International career
| 1932–1937 | Switzerland | 12 | (0) |
- * Club domestic league appearances and goals

Louis Gobet (born 28 October 1908 — 1995) was a Swiss footballer who played for Switzerland in the 1934 FIFA World Cup. He also played for FC Blue Stars Zürich and FC Bern 1894.

== International career ==
Gobet's first cap was against Austria in Vienna on 23 October 1932. He was part of the Swiss’ team for the 1934 FIFA World Cup, but didn’t play any match.
