= Tullio Grassi =

Swiss footballer (1910-1985)

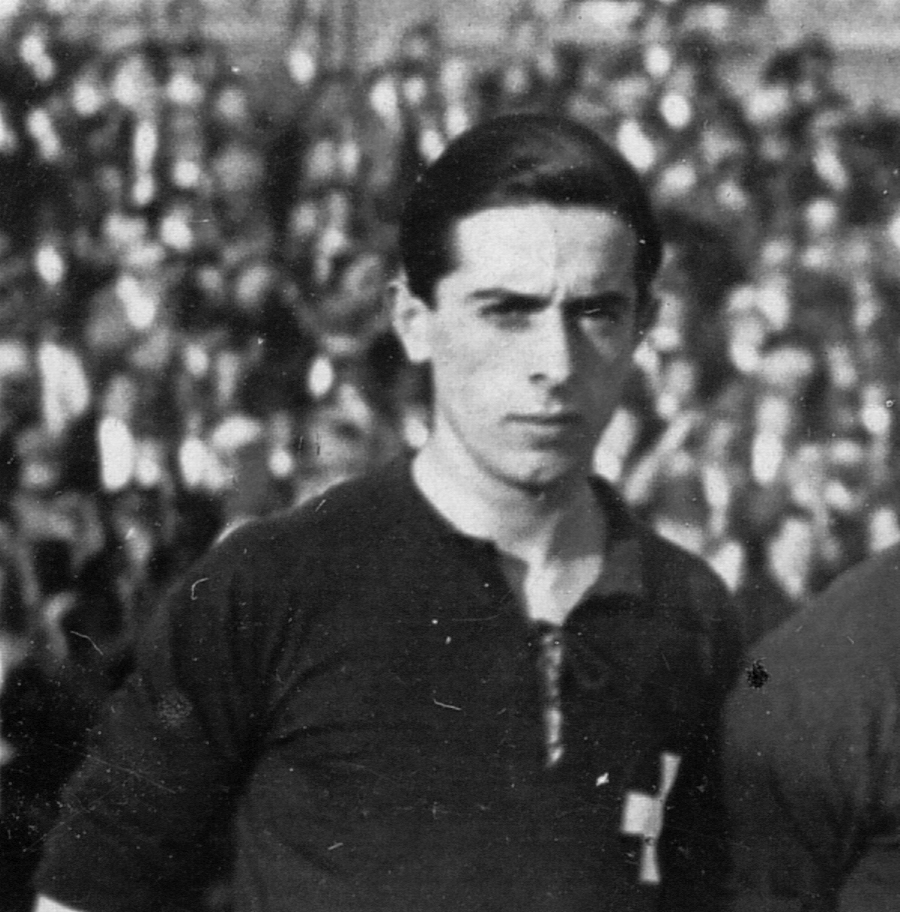

Personal information
- Date of birth: 5 February 1910
- Date of death: 8 November 1985 (aged 75)
- Position: Forward

Senior career*
Years	Team	Apps	(Gls)
1929–1930	Chiasso		
1930–1932	Grasshopper Club Zürich		
1938–1939	Lugano		

International career
1929–1938	Switzerland	7	(2)

Managerial career
- 1943–1945: Chiasso
- 1949–1951: Chiasso
- 1951–1952: Lugano
- 1955–1959: Chiasso
- 1959–1960: Lugano
- * Club domestic league appearances and goals

Tullio Grassi (5 February 1910 – 8 November 1985) was a Swiss football player and coach who played for Switzerland in the 1938 FIFA World Cup. He also played for FC Chiasso, Grasshopper Club Zürich, and FC Lugano.
