= Erwin Hochsträsser =

Swiss footballer

Personal information
- Date of birth: 1911
- Date of death: 15 November 1980 (aged 68–69)
- Place of death: Lausanne, Switzerland
- Position: Forward

Senior career*
Years	Team	Apps	(Gls)
- FC Lausanne-Sport
- BSC Young Boys

International career
1933-1934	Switzerland	2	(1)
- * Club domestic league appearances and goals

Erwin Hochsträsser (1911 - 15 November 1980) was a Swiss footballer who was a squad member for Switzerland in the 1934 FIFA World Cup. He also played for FC Lausanne-Sport and BSC Young Boys.

== International career ==
His first cap was against Romania on 29 October 1933, for Switzerland’s second 1934 FIFA World Cup qualification game. He scored his first and only international goal equalizing for and qualifying Switzerland for the 1934 FIFA World Cup.

He was part Switzerland’s team for the 1934 FIFA World Cup but he didn’t play in the final tournament.

His second and last cap was against Germany on 19 November 1933 for a friendly game.

== Death ==
He died in Lausanne on 15 November 1980.
