= Law Adam =

Dutch footballer (1908-1941)

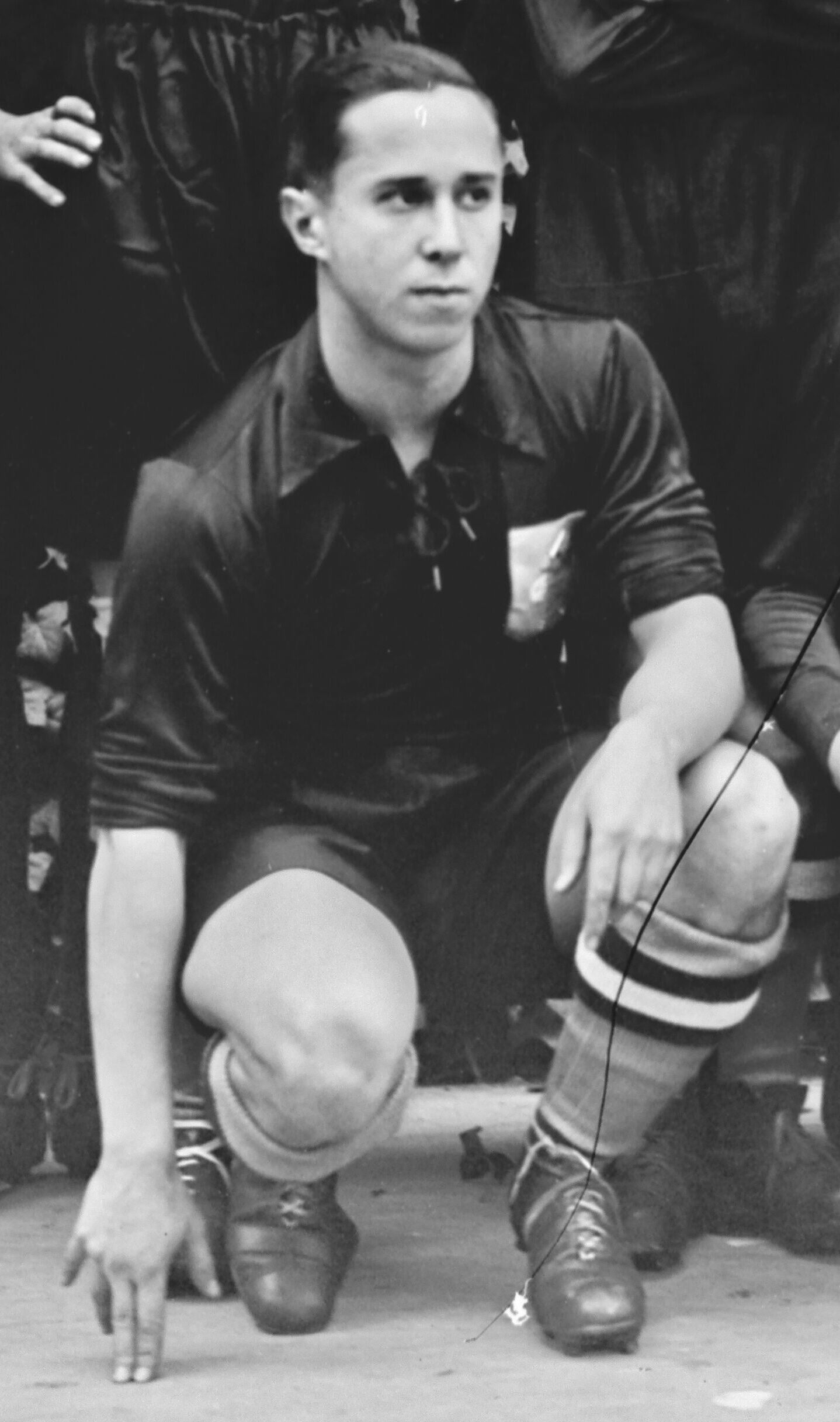

Personal information
- Full name: Lawrence Adam
- Date of birth: 11 June 1908
- Place of birth: Probolinggo, Dutch East Indies
- Date of death: 15 May 1941 (aged 32)
- Place of death: Surabaya, Dutch East Indies
- Position: Forward

Senior career*
Years	Team	Apps	(Gls)
–1927	HVV		
1927–1933	Grasshoppers		
1933	HVV		

International career
1929	Switzerland	1	(0)
1930–1931	Netherlands	11	(6)
- * Club domestic league appearances and goals

Lawrence "Law" Adam (11 June 1908 – 15 May 1941) was a Dutch-Swiss football player who played as a forward. He was born in Probolinggo, Dutch East Indies and died in Surabaya, Dutch East Indies. Law Adam is reportedly the first European footballer to use the Scissors move, also known as the step over, earning the nickname "Adam the Scissorsman" in the 1920s and 1930s.

== Club career ==
Adam started his football career for HVV Den Haag in the Netherlands. At the age of 19, he started his study in Zürich, where he played for Grasshopper Club Zürich. He made his debut for Switzerland in a match against Austria in 1929. The Dutch national team visited Switzerland a year later, and Adam was invited to play for his native Netherlands. Switzerland won the match 6–3. Law Adam would play eleven matches for the Netherlands, scoring six goals. He scored both goals in the 2–0 victory of the Netherlands over Germany in Düsseldorf in 1932.

In the spring of 1933, Adam returned to HVV Den Haag, but heart problems forced him to end his career a few months later, at the age of 24.

== Death ==
Adam died in 1941, at the age of 32, during a friendly match between football clubs Thor and Anasher in Surabaya in the Dutch East Indies. Adam had scored two goals and given three assists during the match, and left the pitch in the eighth minute of the second half, with his hand on his heart. Referee W.A. Lambeck wrote about the death of Adam in magazine De Scheidsrechter. He recalled asking Adam if it was serious, to which Adam had replied: "No, but my heart is playing up again and they've got a nice lead, so I can get dressed now." Lambeck continued: "When I entered the dressing room after the final whistle, Adam was on the massage table, all blue. The doctor and the heart specialist, who were immediately summoned, tried to revive the spirits by giving him injections in the heart area. Half an hour later, they could only establish death."
