= Gaston Tschirren =

Swiss footballer (1906–1983)

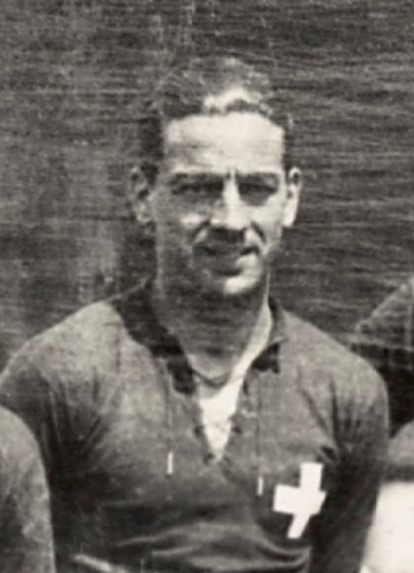
- Gaston Tschirren in 1928

Personal information
- Full name: Gaston Camille Tschirren
- Date of birth: 3 February 1906
- Place of birth: Lausanne
- Date of death: 26 February 1983 (aged 77)

International career
| Years | Team | Apps | (Gls) |
| 1926–1932 | Switzerland | 15 | (1) |

Managerial career
- 1950: Switzerland
- 1951–1953: Switzerland

Gaston Camille Tschirren (3 February 1906 – 26 February 1983) was a Swiss footballer. He competed in the men's tournament at the 1928 Summer Olympics.
