= FC Monthey =

Swiss football club

- Full name: Football Club Monthey
- Founded: 1910; 116 years ago
- Ground: Stade Philippe Pottier, Monthey
- Capacity: 1,800
- Chairman: Julio Tejeda
- Manager: Lucien Dénervaud
- League: 1. Liga Classic
- 2024–25: Group 1, 11th of 16
Home colours	Away colours

FC Monthey is an association football club from Monthey, Switzerland. The club currently play in the 1. Liga Classic, the fourth tier of Swiss football.

== History ==
FC Monthey has played one season in the Swiss premier division Serie A in 1930–31.

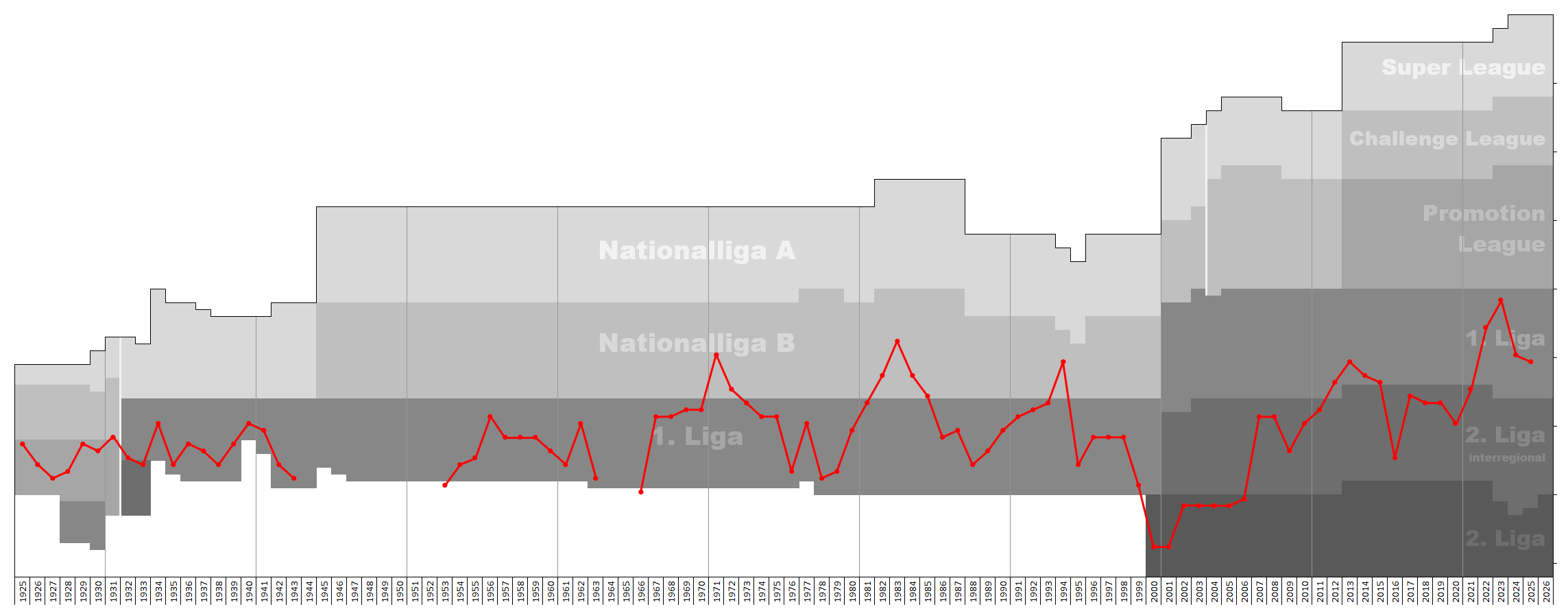
Chart of FC Monthey table positions in the Swiss football league system

== Current squad ==
As of 10 April, 2026. Note: Flags indicate national team as defined under FIFA eligibility rules; some limited exceptions apply. Players may hold more than one non-FIFA nationality.

No.	Pos.	Nation	Player
1	GK	ITA	Steve Saffioti
3	DF	SUI	Léo Würsten
4	DF	BIH	Elvir Muminovic
5	MF	SEN	Thierry Diatta
6	MF	ITA	Stefane Rauti
7	FW	KOS	Artan Asani
8	MF	KOS	Mersim Asllani
9	FW	SUI	Kevin Derivaz
10	FW	SUI	Kevin Mapwata
11	DF	SUI	Kévin Bakashala
14	DF	SEN	Elhadji Ciss

No.	Pos.	Nation	Player
15	FW	POR	Cristiano Carvalho
16	MF	SUI	Besart Tafaj
17	MF	SUI	Théo Moret
18	MF	POR	André Gomes
19	MF	SUI	Bastian Gasser
20	DF	SUI	Ludovic Delley
21	MF	POR	Marlon Oliveira
22	DF	FRA	Anthony Mermy
23	GK	SUI	David de Kalbermatten
25	DF	SUI	Killiam Aprile
26	FW	FRA	Jérémie Hostettler
30	DF	SUI	Antoine Tissières

== Former players ==
- (Czech Republic) Milan Šimůnek
