= Urania Genève Sport =

Association football club

UGS Genève
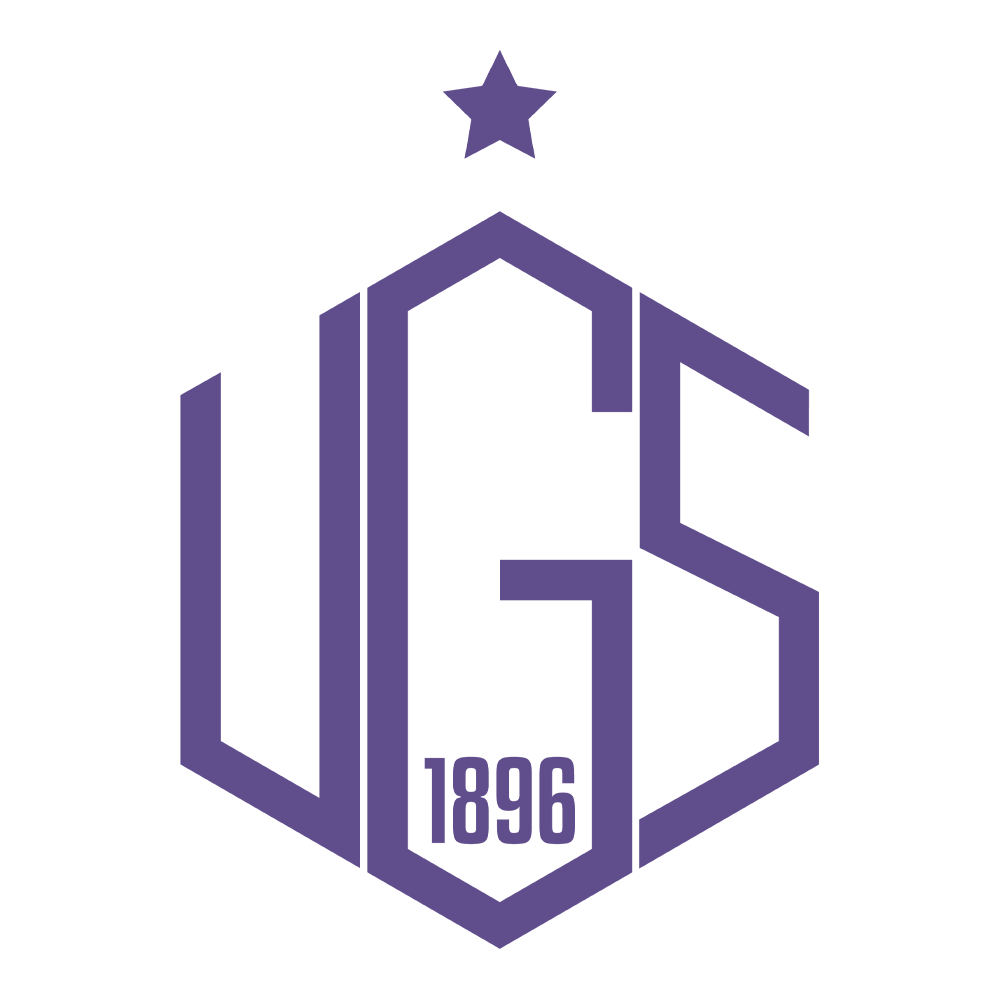
- Full name: Urania Genève Sport
- Short name: UGS
- Founded: 1896; 130 years ago
- Ground: Stade de Frontenex
- Capacity: 4,000
- Chairman: Stefano Vito Bellingeri
- Manager: Uros Cetkovic
- League: 2. Liga Interregional
- 2024–25: Group 1, 9th of 16
| Home colours | Away colours |

Urania Genève Sport is a Swiss omnisport club based in Geneva, canton of Geneva. Its football section was founded in 1896. The team currently play in 2. Liga Interregional, the fifth tier of Swiss football.

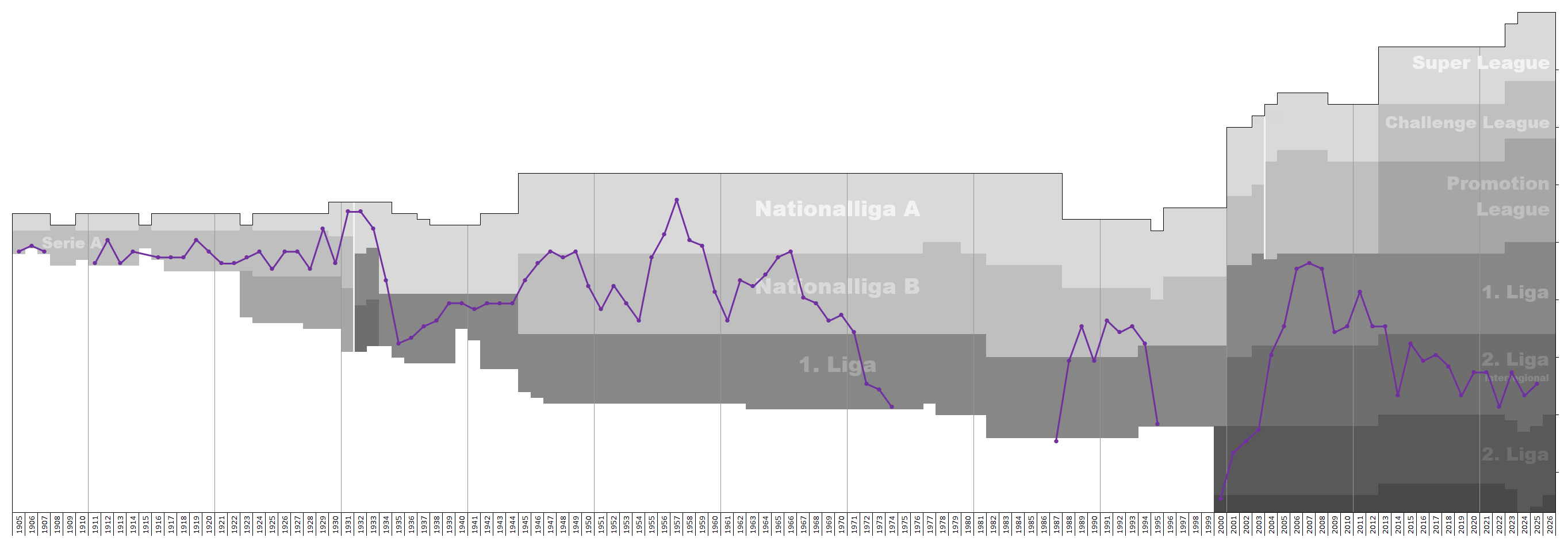
Chart of FC UGS table positions in the Swiss football league system

== History ==
The current club was founded in 1922 through a merger between FC Urania and FC Genève.

Its main title is the Swiss cup, won in 1929 against Young Boys. This same year, the club is champion of the French part of Switzerland (Champion romand).

In 1931, UGS finishes at the second place of the Swiss championship, behind Grasshopper Club Zürich.

== Managers ==
- Waldvogel (1928–29)
- Conrad Ross (1932)
- Albert Châtelain (1940–49)
- Ludwick Dupal (1949–50)
- Georges Aeby (1950–53)
- Genia Walachek (1953–60)
- Albert Châtelain (1961–71)
- Roland Guillod (1971–72)
- René Schneider (1972–73)
- Albert Châtelain (1973–74)
- Francis Anker (1974–76)
- Gaston Sar (1976–77)
- Jean Coutaz
- Rody Tschan (1981–84)
- Paul Garbani (1987–89)
- Gérard Castella (1989–93)
- Miroslav Tlokinski (1993–94)
- Paul Garbani (1994–95)
- Paul Garbani (1997-01)
- Albert Châtelain (2001–02)
- Jean-Noël Dumont (2002–05)
- Borisav Mitrovic (2005–07)
- David Joye (2008–09)
- Philippe Tschiember (2009–13)
- Hervé Musquère (2013-21)
- Virgile Guekam (2021-22)
- Uros Cetkovic (2022 – ?)

== Honours ==
=== League ===
- Swiss Super League:
  - Runners-up (1): 1930–31
- Swiss Challenge League:
  - Winners (3): 1947–48, 1954–55, 1964–65
  - Runners-up (1): 1945–46

=== Cup ===
- Swiss Cup:
  - Winners (1): 1928–29
  - Runners-up (1): 1931–32

=== International competitions ===
- Coppa dei Vincitori:
  - Winners (1): 1931
