= Stade de Frontenex =

Football stadium in Geneva, Switzerland

Coordinates: 46°12′24″N 6°10′36″E

Stade de Frontenex is a football and 400 meter track & field stadium in Geneva, Switzerland. It is the home of UGS Genève and has a capacity of 4,000.
