= 1930–31 FC Basel season =

FC Basel
1930–31 season
- Chairman: Otto Kuhn
- First team coach: Gustav Putzendopler
- Ground: Landhof, Basel
- Serie A: Group Stage: 2nd Final Stage: 4th
- Swiss Cup: 1st round
- Top goalscorer: League: Leopold Kielholz (19); All: Leopold Kielholz (20)
- Highest home attendance: 8,000 on 23 November 1930 vs Nordstern Basel and on 17 May 1931 vs Nordstern Basel
- Lowest home attendance: 3,000 on 28 December 1930 vs Luzern
- Average home league attendance: 5,200

The FC Basel 1930–31 season was their thirty eighth season since the club's foundation on 15 November 1893. FC Basel played their home games in the Landhof in the district Wettstein in Kleinbasel. The club's chairman was former player Otto Kuhn for the second successive year.

== Overview ==
Former player Gustav Putzendopler was appointed as new coach/manager, succeeding Gyula Kertész who had moved on to Hamburger SV. Putzendopler coached the team in a total of 31 matches in their 1930–31 season. 23 of these matches were in the domestic league, 19 in the qualification round and four in the final round. Further, one match was in the Swiss Cup and seven games were friendly matches. Of these seven friendlies three were played at home in the Landhof, one other game was played in Switzerland, two in Germany and one in Mulhouse. Of the friendly games two were won, two were drawn and three ended with a defeat. Of the entire 31 matches, 15 ended with a victory, five with a draw and there were 11 defeats.

The 1930–31 Swiss Serie A was divided into three regional groups, new each group with 11 teams, this due to the larger modification in the league system in the next season. The two teams that ended the group at the top of the table continued to the finals. The top six teams in the table would play the following season in the new Nationalliga, the bottom five teams would play the following season in the new second level named 1 Liga. Basel were allocated to the Central group together with the other local clubs Concordia Basel, Nordstern Basel and Old Boys Basel and newly promoted Black Stars Basel. The other six teams allocated to this group were Young Boys Bern, FC Bern, Aarau, Grenchen and Solothurn and newly promoted FC Luzern.

FC Basel played a good league season, out of the first nine games resulted just one defeat. The games in the new year were somewhat more problematic. In the last game of the season a defeat against Nordstern nearly cost them their place within the top two, because now these two teams were level on points. Basel and Nordstern had to play a barrage and put themselves through to the final by winning two goals to one. Leopold Kielholz was the team's top league goal scorer with 19 goals, he managed a hat-trick in the game against Grenchen on 28 September 1930. Jørgen Juve was second best scorer with 10 goals, he managed a hat-trick in the game against Black Stars Basel on 1 March 1931.

In the preliminary round of the Swiss Cup Basel were drawn at home against FC Locarno and lost the game after extra time. The game had ended 2–2 after 90 minutes, after 120 minutes the score was 4–4 and so a further 2x 15 minutes were played. The final score was 4–5 and the winning goal was scored in the 150 minute.

A curiosity note to this season is the player Hector Fisher. A tennis player, described as a cosmopolitan "Burmese-Siamese-English-Swiss" athlete. After spending time at Oxford University, he had played tennis there, he moved to Switzerland and played tennis at higher levels. He represented Switzerland during his tennis career and played in the Davis Cup in the years between 1931 and 1939. Fisher also won the Swiss Open in Gstaad four times in 1923, 1928, 1929 and 1931. He played football for Montreux-Sports and played for Basel in this season.

== Players ==
Squad members

Note: Flags indicate national team as defined under FIFA eligibility rules; some limited exceptions apply. Players may hold more than one non-FIFA nationality.

No.	Pos.	Nation	Player
—	GK	SUI	Traugott Märki
—	GK	SUI	Hans Nikles
—	GK	SUI	Ernst Zorzotti
—	DF	SUI	Armando Ardizzoia
—	DF	FRG	Hermann Enderlin (II)
—	DF	SUI	Ernst Grauer
—	MF	SUI	Ernst Hufschmid
—	DF	SUI	Ernst Weber
—	MF	SUI	Max Galler (II)
—	MF	SUI	Otto Meier
—	MF	SUI	Walter Notz

No.	Pos.	Nation	Player
—	MF	SUI	Emil Riedener
—	MF	SUI	Paul Schaub
—	FW	SUI	Karl Bielser
—	FW	FRG	Alfred Enderlin (I)
—	FW	SUI	Hector Fisher
—	FW	SUI	Alfred Jaeck
—	FW	NOR	Jørgen Juve
—	FW	SUI	Leopold Kielholz
—	FW	SUI	Alfred Schlecht
—	FW	POL	Leopold Wionsowsky
—			Fritz Griesbaum

Players who left the squad

Note: Flags indicate national team as defined under FIFA eligibility rules; some limited exceptions apply. Players may hold more than one non-FIFA nationality.

No.	Pos.	Nation	Player
—	GK	SUI	Stefan Grünfeld
—	DF	SUI	Alfred Heidig

No.	Pos.	Nation	Player
—	DF	SUI	Peter Riesterer
—	FW	SUI	Walter Müller
—	FW	SUI	Max Strasser

== Results ==
=== Legend ===
Win Draw Loss Postponed

=== Friendly matches ===
==== Pre- and mid-season ====
August 1930 Pre-season	Friedlingen (West Germany)	2–6	(Switzerland) Basel	Friedlingen
	Goal	Summary	Goal

August 1930 Pre-season	Rheinfelden (West Germany)	–	(Switzerland) Basel	Rheinfelden

17 August 1930 Pre-season	St. Gallen (Switzerland)	5–1	(Switzerland) Basel	Espenmoos, St. Gallen
	Volery (1:0); Meier (I) (2:0); Meier (I) (3:0); Volery (4:0); Volery (5:0)	Summary	(5:1) Kielholz	Attendance: 1,200

25 October 1930 Mid-season	Basel (Switzerland)	5–1	(Switzerland) La Chaux-de-Fonds	Landhof, Basel
15:15	Juve 15' (1:0); Juve (2:0); Juve (3:0); Wionsowsky (4:0); Kielholz (5:0)	Summary	75' (5:1) Jäggi	Attendance: 1,500

9 November 1930 Mid-season	Biel-Bienne (Switzerland)	2–2	(Switzerland) Basel	Biel/Bienne
	Goal	Summary	Goal

7 December 1930 Mid-season	Mulhouse (France)	3–3	(Switzerland) Basel	Mulhouse
	Zolg (1:0); Zolg (2:0); Kaufmann (3:0)	Summary	(3:1) Juve (3:2) Juve (3:3) Kielholz	Attendance: 800

==== Winter break and end of season ====
18 January 1931 Winter break	Basel (Switzerland)	1–2	(Switzerland) Etoile Carouge	Landhof, Basel
15:00	Jaeck (1:2)	Summary	(0:1) Borcier (0:2) Losio	Attendance: 700; Referee: (Switzerland) Pollitz Basel

25 May 1931 Mid-season	Basel (Switzerland)	3–4	(England) West Ham United	Landhof, Basel
17:45	Kielholz (1:1); Kielholz (2:1); Kielholz (3:3)	Summary	(0:1) (2:2) (2:3) (3:4)	Attendance: 2,500

=== Serie A ===
==== Central Group results ====
7 September 1930 Round 1	Basel	2–1	FC Bern	Landhof, Basel
13:15	Kielholz 10' (1:1); Kielholz 36' (2:1)	Summary	7' (1:0) Schwaar	Attendance: 4,000; Referee: (Switzerland) H. Neumann Basel

14 September 1930 Round 2	Young Boys	0–3	Basel	Wankdorf Stadium, Bern
		Summary	25' (0:1) Bielser; 53' (0:2) Kielholz; 54' (0:3) Enderlin (I)	Attendance: 4,000; Referee: (Switzerland) Demartines Lausanne

28 September 1930 Round 3	Basel	4–0	Grenchen	Landhof, Basel
14:00	Kielholz 10' (1:0); Kielholz 30' (2:0); Kielholz 73' (3:0); Enderlin (I) 83' (4:0)	Summary		Attendance: 4,000; Referee: (Switzerland) Meyer Lausanne

19 October 1930 Round 4	Aarau	4–3	Basel	Stadion Brügglifeld, Aarau
14:45	Romberg; Taddei 22' (2:1); Romberg 48' (3:1); Romberg 67' (4:1)	Summary	7' (1:1) Jaeck; 70' (4:2) Wionsowsky; 80' (4:3) Bielser	Attendance: 2,500; Referee: (Switzerland) Bitterli Baden

16 November 1930 Round 5	Basel	2–1	Solothurn	Landhof, Basel
13:00	Kielholz 38' (1:1); Schlecht (2:1)	Summary	22' (0:1) Briggen	Attendance: 5,000; Referee: (Switzerland) Reber Baden

23 November 1930 Round 6	Basel	2–0	Nordstern Basel	Landhof, Basel
14:30	Juve 40' (1:0); Kielholz 85' (2:0)	Summary		Attendance: 8,000; Referee: (Switzerland) Mercet Locarno

30 November 1930 Round 7	Old Boys	2–2	Basel	Stadion Schützenmatte, Basel
14:30	Bechtel 8' (pen. 1:0); Bechtel 50' (2:1)	Summary	(1:1) Hufschmid; 69' (2:2) Juve	Attendance: 3,500; Referee: (Switzerland) Demartines Lausanne

21 December 1930 Round 8	Concordia Basel	1–5	Basel	Stadion Schützenmatte, Basel
14:30	Christen (1:1)	Summary	(0:1) Jaeck (1:2) Juve (1:3) Jaeck (1:1) Kielholz (1:5) Kielholz	Attendance: 2,500; Referee: (Switzerland)

28 December 1930 Round 9	Basel	2–2	Luzern	Landhof, Basel
14:30	Juve 15' (1:0); Kielholz 49' (2:0)	Summary	66' (2:1) Ronchetti; 86' (2:2) Waldis	Attendance: 3,000; Referee: (Switzerland) Mercet Locarno

11 January 1931 Round 10	Basel	0–1	Old Boys	Landhof, Basel
14:30		Summary	60' (pen. 0:1) Bechtel	Attendance: 3,000; Referee: (Switzerland) Hafner Basel

25 January 1930 Round 11	Basel	3–1	Aarau	Stadion Rankhof, Basel
14:45	Juve 5' (1:0); Wionsowsky 15' (2:0); Enderlin (I) 89' (pen. 3:1)	Summary	(pen. 2:1) Wernli	Attendance: 3,500; Referee: (Switzerland)

22 February 1931 Round 12	Grenchen	3–2	Basel	Stadion Brühl, Grenchen
	Gerber 15' (1:0); Wuillemin 20' (2:0); Righetti 55' (3:1)	Summary	40' (2:1) Schlecht (3:2) Schlecht	Attendance: 1,000; Referee: (Switzerland) Allemann Biel/Bienne

1 March 1931 Round 13	Black Stars Basel	1–7	Basel	Buschweilerhof, Basel
15:00	Greiner (II) (1:7)	Summary	(pen. 0:1) Enderlin (I) (0:2) Juve (0:3) Juve (0:4) Schlecht (0:5) Juve (0:6) Kielholz (0:7) Enderlin (I)	Attendance: 1,500; Referee: (Switzerland)

22 March 1930 Round 14	Basel	3–1	Young Boys	Landhof, Basel
15:00	Jaeck 20' (1:0); Juve 40' (2:0); Wionsowsky 55' (3:1)	Summary	(2:1) Baumgartner	Attendance: 7,000; Referee: (Switzerland) Menke

12 April 1931 Round 15	Solothurn	4–2	Basel	Stadion FC Solothurn, Solothurn
	Dreier (pen. 1:1); Dreier (2:1); Jäggi (3:1); Burk 75' (4:2)	Summary	3' (0:1) Notz (3:2) Galler	Attendance: 1,500; Referee: (Switzerland) Mercet Locarno

19 April 1931 Round 16	Basel	3–0	Concordia Basel	Landhof, Basel
15:00	Kielholz 44' (pen. 1:0); Kielholz 46' (2:0); Enderlin (I) 61' (3:0)	Summary		Attendance: 6,000; Referee: (Switzerland) Brüschweiler Zürich

26 April 1931 Round 17	FC Bern	1–3	Basel	Neufeld, Bern
	Riva 20' (1:0)	Summary	20' (1:1) Enderlin (I); 55' (1:2) Kielholz; 80' (1:3) Grauer	Attendance: 4,000; Referee: (Switzerland) W. Bangerter La Chaux-de-Fonds

3 May 1931 Round 18	Nordstern Basel	5–0	Basel	Stadion Rankhof, Basel
15:00	Bucco 25' (1:0); Büche 68' (2:0); Consigli (3:0); Büche (4:0); Ehrenbolger (I) 89' (5:0)	Summary		Attendance: 9,000; Referee: (Switzerland) W. Bangerter La Chaux-de-Fonds

==== Central Group play-off ====
17 May 1929 Play-pff second place	Basel	2–1	Nordstern Basel	Stadion Schützenmatte, Basel
15:00	Kielholz 39' (1:0); Schlecht 78' (2:1)	Summary	60' (1:1) Büche	Attendance: 8,000; Referee: (Switzerland) Osterwalder Bern

==== Central group table ====
Pos	Team	Pld	W	D	L	GF	GA	GD	Pts	Qualification
1	Young Boys	18	12	2	4	44	21	+23	26	Group winners / Advance to finals
2	Basel	18	11	2	5	48	28	+20	24	Play-off winners, advance to finals
3	Nordstern Basel	18	11	2	5	49	23	+26	24	Play-off losers, 1931–32 Nationalliga
4	Old Boys	18	9	3	6	36	35	+1	21	1931–32 Nationalliga
5	Aarau	18	9	2	7	38	37	+1	20	1931–32 Nationalliga
6	FC Bern	18	6	3	9	34	33	+1	15	1931–32 Nationalliga
7	Concordia Basel	18	5	3	10	25	46	−21	13	1 Liga 1931–32
8	Solothurn	18	4	5	9	26	40	−14	13	1 Liga 1931–32
9	Luzern	10	4	3	3	16	14	+2	11	1 Liga 1931–32
10	Grenchen	18	5	1	12	39	59	−20	11	1 Liga 1931–32
11	Black Stars Basel	10	1	2	7	12	31	−19	4	1 Liga 1931–32

Source: rsssf.com

==== Final group results ====
31 May 1931 Round 1	Basel	2–2	Urania Genève Sport	Landhof, Basel
14:45	Kielholz 5' (1:0); Schlecht 48' (2:1)	Summary	16' (1:1) Zila; 67' (2:2) Stalder	Attendance: 2,000; Referee: (Switzerland) Ruoff Bern

7 June 1931 Round 2	Basel	1–4	Grasshopper Club	Landhof, Basel
17:00	Enderlin (I) 15' (pen. 1:1)	Summary	13' (0:1) Trello; 25' (2:1) Grassi (1:3) Trello (1:4) Adam	Attendance: 8,000; Referee: (Switzerland) Osterwalder Bern

21 June 1931 Round 3	La Chaux-de-Fonds	3–1	Basel	Stade Charrière, La Chaux-de-Fonds
17:30	Haefeli (1:0); Held (2:1); Grimm 85' (3:1)	Summary	(1:1) Schlecht	Attendance: 2,000; Referee: (Switzerland) Ruoff Bern

28 June 1931 Round 4	Blue Stars Zürich	3–4	Basel	Letzigrund, Zürich
	Ilg (1:2); Rey 85' (2:3)	Summary	12' (0:1) Kielholz (0:2) Kielholz; 62' (1:3) Enderlin (I)	Attendance: 1,000; Referee: (Switzerland) Allemann Biel/Bienne

==== Final group table ====
Pos	Team	Pld	W	D	L	GF	GA	GD	Pts	Qualification
1	Grasshopper Club	4	3	1	0	12	2	+10	7	Swiss champions
2	Urania Genève Sport	4	2	2	0	8	5	+3	6	
3	La Chaux-de-Fonds	4	2	0	2	10	8	+2	4	
4	Blue Stars Zürich	4	1	1	2	9	9	0	3	
5	Basel	4	1	1	2	7	11	−4	3	
6	Young Boys	4	0	1	3	4	15	−11	1	

Source: rsssf.com

=== Swiss Cup ===
5 October 1930 1st principal round	Basel	4–5 (Note: Extra time 2x 30 Minutes. Score after 90 minutes 2:2, after 120 minutes 4:4) (a.e.t.)	Locarno	Landhof, Basel
14:30	Kielholz 11' (1:1); Wionsowsky (2:1); Wionsowsky 94' (3:2); Bielser 110' (4:2)	FCB summary	5' (0:1) Case (II); 60' (2:2) Spehler; 111' (4:3) Mutter; 120' (4:4) Case (II); 150' (4:5) Carminati	Attendance: 3,500; Referee: (Switzerland) Albert Osterwalder (Bern)
Note: Locarno played the first half of the 1930/31 season in the second-tier and the second half of the season in the top-tier.

== See also ==
- History of FC Basel
- List of FC Basel players
- List of FC Basel seasons

== Sources ==
- Rotblau: Jahrbuch Saison 2014/2015. Publisher: FC Basel Marketing AG. ISBN 978-3-7245-2027-6
- Die ersten 125 Jahre. Publisher: Josef Zindel im Friedrich Reinhardt Verlag, Basel. ISBN 978-3-7245-2305-5
- FCB team 1929–30 at fcb-archiv.ch
- Switzerland 1929-30 at RSSSF
