= 1928–29 FC Basel season =

FC Basel
1928–29 season
- Chairman: Hans Rupprecht
- First team coach: Gyula Kertész
- Ground: Landhof, Basel
- Serie A: Group Stage: 2nd
- Swiss Cup: Second round
- Top goalscorer: League: Karl Bielser (15); All: Karl Bielser (20)
- Highest home attendance: 5,500 on 30 December 1928 vs Nordstern Basel and on 7 April 1929 vs Young Boys
- Lowest home attendance: 3,000 on 30 September 1928 vs Grenchen and on 3 March 1929 vs FC Bern
- Average home league attendance: 4,250

The FC Basel 1928–29 season was their thirty sixth season since the club's foundation on 15 November 1893. The club's new chairman was Hans Rupprecht who took over the presidency from Karl Ibach at the AGM on 7 July 1928. FC Basel played their home games in the Landhof in the district Wettstein in Kleinbasel.

== Overview ==
The former Hungarian international footballer Gyula Kertész was appointed as coach/manager at the beginning of the 1928–29 Serie A season. After Percy Humphreys (1913–14) and Max Breunig (1922–23), Kertész was just the third professional trainer that the club had engaged up until this point. The decision to employ a professional football trainer/manager was made because FC Basel had slipped well below the level of their local rivals Nordstern, who had qualified for the finals three times in the last five years.

Basel played a total of 29 matches in their 1928–29 season. 16 of these were in the domestic league, three were in the Swiss Cup and 10 were friendly matches. Of these 10 friendlies three were played at home in the Landhof and seven were away games. Apart from the away game against Mulhouse all other matches were in Switzerland. Basel scored 24 goals in these friendlies and conceded 32.

The 1928–29 Swiss Serie A was divided into three regional groups, each group with nine teams. The teams that won each group continue to the finals and the last placed team in each group had to play a barrage against relegation. Basel were allocated to the Central group together with the other three local clubs Concordia Basel, Nordstern Basel and Old Boys Basel. The other five teams allocated to this group were Young Boys Bern, FC Bern, Aarau, Grenchen and Solothurn. This season was a very competitive one. After a defeat against YB in the first match, it was obvious that a professional coach was at work, because the team won eight of the next ten matches. The team rose to the top of the table, thanks to the good goal scoring of their best forwards Alfred Schlecht, Karl Bielser and Alfred Enderlin. But then, an unawaited 1–4 home defeat against lower placed local rivals Concordia changed everything. In the last five matches Basel managed only three draws and were defeated twice. The top five teams ended the season within four points of each other and each team won eight of their 16 matches. With 20 points Basel ended the season in second position, just one point behind group winners Young Boys, who advanced to the finals and then won the championship.

Basel scored 48 league goals and conceded 32. Karl Bielser was the team's top league goalscorer with 15 goals, Alfred Schlecht was second top scorer with 14 goals and Alfred Enderlin scored nine. Further goal scorers were Walter Müller with four, Max Strasser with three, Paul Schaub with two and Otto Meier one.

In the Swiss Cup Basel were drawn against Baden in the preliminary round, against Bülach in the first round, but were eliminated by Concordia Basel in the second round. Concordia continued the competition and reached the semi-final, there losing to Urania Genève Sport, who won the final against Young Boys 1–0, which was played in the Stade de Frontenex in Geneva.

== Players ==
Squad members

Note: Flags indicate national team as defined under FIFA eligibility rules; some limited exceptions apply. Players may hold more than one non-FIFA nationality.

No.	Pos.	Nation	Player
—	GK	SUI	Traugott Märki
—	GK	SUI	Ernst Zorzotti
—	DF	SUI	Armando Ardizzoia
—	DF	FRG	Hermann Enderlin (II)
—	DF	SUI	Peter Riesterer
—	DF	SUI	Ernst Weber
—	DF	SUI	Hugo Flubacher
—	MF	SUI	Max Galler (II)
—	MF	SUI	Georg Heimann

No.	Pos.	Nation	Player
—	MF	SUI	Otto Meier
—	MF	SUI	Paul Schaub
—	FW	SUI	Karl Bielser
—	FW	FRG	Alfred Enderlin (I)
—	FW	SUI	Walter Müller
—	FW	SUI	Max Oswald
—	FW	SUI	Alfred Schlecht
—	FW	SUI	Max Strasser
—	FW	SUI	Karl Wüthrich
—	FW	SUI	Eugen Schmid

Players who left the squad

Note: Flags indicate national team as defined under FIFA eligibility rules; some limited exceptions apply. Players may hold more than one non-FIFA nationality.

No.	Pos.	Nation	Player
—	GK	SUI	Ernst Christ
—	GK	SUI	Arthur Fahr
—	DF	SUI	Jakob Bürgin
—	FW	SUI	Emil Arlt
—	DF	SUI	Fritz Gerster
—	FW	FRA	Max Lehmann

No.	Pos.	Nation	Player
—	DF	SUI	Louis Matthey
—	FW	SUI	Hans Rau
—	FW	SUI	Hans Streng
—	DF	SUI	Gustav Vogt
—	FW	SUI	Franz Zeiser
—	FW	SUI	? Weber

== Results ==
=== Legend ===
Win Draw Loss Postponed

=== Friendly matches ===
==== Pre- and mid-season ====
12 August 1928 Pre-season	Étoile-Sporting (Switzerland)	2–0	(Switzerland) Basel	Stade des Eplatures, La Chaux-de-Fonds
15:00	Matzinger 20' (1:0); Matzinger (2:0)	Summary		Attendance: 100; Referee: (Switzerland) Schumacher La Chaux-de-Fonds

26 August 1928 Pre-season	Lausanne-Sport (Switzerland)	3–0	(Switzerland) Basel	Stade de Cantonal, Neuchâtel
11:00	Fauguel 25' (1:0); Fauguel (2:0); Syrvet (3:0)	Summary		Referee: (Switzerland) Voisard Biel/Bienne

26 August 1928 Pre-season	Cantonal Neuchatel (Switzerland)	3–0	(Switzerland) Basel	Stade de Cantonal, Neuchâtel
14:30	Abegglen (III) 8' (1:0); Abegglen (III) 11' (2:0); Struppler (3:1); Abegglen (III) (4:1); Kohler (5:2)	Summary	23' (2:1) (4:2)	Referee: (Switzerland) Voisard Biel/Bienne

16 September 1928 Mid-season	Basel (Switzerland)	4–3 (a.e.t.)	(France) AS Valentigney	Olympique de la Pontaise, Lausanne
09:00	Bielser (1:0); Müller (2:1) (3:1); Bielser (4:3)	Summary	(1:1) Goll (3:2) (3:3)	Referee: (Switzerland) Schneider

16 September 1928 Mid-season	Lausanne-Sport (Switzerland)	7–3	(Switzerland) Basel	Olympique de la Pontaise, Lausanne
15:30	Bolomey 6' (1:0); Bolomey (2:0); Hart (3:0); Bolomey (4:0); Bolomey (5:0); Hart (pen. 6:0); Bolomey (7:3)	Summary	(6:1) Müller (6:2) Enderlin (I) (6:3) Enderlin (I)	Referee: (Switzerland) Mercet Locarno

2 December 1928 Mid-season	Mulhouse (France)	2–3	(Switzerland) Basel	Stade de Bourtzwiller, Mulhouse
	Lieb (pen. 1:3); Huerzeler (2:3)	Summary	(0:1) Bielser (0:2) Bielser (0:3) Bielser	Attendance: 2,000; Referee: (France) Studer Strasbourg

==== Winter break to end of season ====
24 February 1929 Winter break	Lugano (Switzerland)	4–3	(Switzerland) Basel	Campo Marzio, Lugano
14:30	Costa 20' (1:1); Fink (2:2); Costa 49' (3:2); Hintermann (4:3)	Summary	(0:1); 35' (1:2) Müller; 75' (3:3) Strasser	Attendance: 1,200; Referee: (Switzerland) Regazzoni Chiasso

1 April 1929 Mid-season	Basel (Switzerland)	2–1	(Switzerland) Young Fellows Zürich	Landhof, Basel
15:00	Enderlin (I) 41' (1:1); Müller 50' (2:1)	Summary	24' (0:1) Brendle	Attendance: 1,500; Referee: (Switzerland) Walter Jordan Basel

5 May 1929 Mid-season	Basel (Switzerland)	4–4	(Switzerland) Biel-Bienne	Landhof, Basel
15:45	Bielser 53' (1:4); Schlecht 55' (2:4); Bielser 57' (3:4); Ardizzoia 70' (4:4)	Summary	5' (0:1) (0:2) (0:3) (0:4)	Attendance: 8,000; Referee: (Switzerland) Krämer Basel

2 June 1929 End of season	Basel (Switzerland)	3–1	(Italy) US Alessandria	Landhof, Basel
15:00	Bielser 44' (1:0); Schaub 79' (2:1); Schlecht 86' (3:1)	Summary	49' (1:1) Cattaneo	Attendance: 3,500; Referee: (Switzerland) Ruoff Bern

=== Serie A ===
==== Central Group results ====
9 September 1928 Round 1	Young Boys	3–0	Basel	Wankdorf Stadium, Bern
	Schicker 12' (1:0); Dasen 38' (2:0) von Arx (II) (pen. 3:0)	Summary		Attendance: 2,500; Referee: (Switzerland) Voisard Biel/Bienne

30 September 1928 Round 2	Basel	3–1	Grenchen	Landhof, Basel
15:00	Schlecht 28' (1:0); Bielser 34' (2:0); Enderlin (I) 65' (pen. 3:1)	Summary	40' (2:1) Schüpbach	Attendance: 3,000; Referee: (Switzerland) Ehrbar St. Gallen

21 October 1928 Round 3	Concordia Basel	1–1	Basel	Landhof, Basel
15:00	Nann 42' (1:0)	Summary	59' (1:1) Enderlin (I)	Attendance: 3,000; Referee: (Switzerland) Regazzoni Chiasso

25 November 1928 Round 4	Basel	9–2	Aarau	Landhof, Basel
13:00	Enderlin (II) (1:0); Bielser (2:0); Schlecht (3:0); Strasser (4:0); Schlecht (5:1); Bielser (6:1); Bielser (7:1); Strasser (8:2); Bielser (9:1)	Summary	(o.g. 4:1) (7:2) Taddei	Referee: (Switzerland) Brüschweiler Zürich

16 December 1928 Round 5	Solothurn	2–7	Basel	Stadion FC Solothurn, Solothurn
	Christen (1:0); Dreier (2:4)	Summary	(1:1) Enderlin (I) (1:2) Enderlin (I) (1:3) Bielser (1:4) Schlecht (2:5) Schlecht (2:6) Schlecht (2:7) Bielser	Referee: (Switzerland) Mercet Locarno

23 December 1928 Round 6	FC Bern	3–5	Basel	Neufeld, Bern
	Reinle (1:3); Brand 48' (2:3); Reinle (3:5)	Summary	13' (0:1) Bielser (0:2) Bielser (0:3) Schlecht (2:4) Schlecht (2:5) Meier	Attendance: 2,500; Referee: (Switzerland) Demartines Lausanne

30 December 1928 Round 7	Basel	1–0	Nordstern Basel	Landhof, Basel
14:30	Müller 65' (1:0)	Summary		Attendance: 5,500; Referee: (Switzerland) Kempf

6 January 1929 Round 8	Basel	0–5	Solothurn	Landhof, Basel
14:30		Summary	16' (0:1) Dreier; 29' (0:2) Dreier; 39' (0:3) Dreier (o.g. 0:4); 80' (0:5)	Referee: (Switzerland) Kempf

27 January 1929 Round 9	Grenchen	0–4	Basel	Stadion Brühl, Grenchen
	Widmer (red card); Füry (red card)	Summary	(pen. 0:1) Enderlin (I) (0:2) Enderlin (I); 48' Müller (0:4) Schlecht	Attendance: 1,500; Referee: (Switzerland) Kempf

3 March 1929 Round 10	Basel	3–0	FC Bern	Landhof, Basel
15:00	Bielser 10' (1:0); Schlecht 12' (2:0); Schlecht (3:0)	Summary		Attendance: 3,000; Referee: (Switzerland) Edm. Dizerens Lausanne

10 March 1929 Round 11	Basel	7–3	Old Boys	Landhof, Basel
15:00	Bielser 19' (1:1); Enderlin (I) 24' (2:1); Müller 25' (3:1); Schlecht 45' (4:1); Bielser 46' (5:1); Schlecht 54' (6:2); Bielser 75' (7:2)	Summary	4' (0:1) Bossi; 51' (5:2) (7:3) Brack	Attendance: 4,500; Referee: (Switzerland) Schumacher La Chaux-de-Fonds

17 March 1929 Round 12	Basel	1–4	Concordia Basel	Landhof, Basel
15:00	Enderlin (I) 43' (1:1)	Summary	30' (0:1) Ehrenbolger; 45' (1:2) Christen (1:3) Ehrenbolger; 59' (pen. 1:4) Nann	Attendance: 4,000; Referee: (Switzerland) Voisard Biel/Bienne

17 April 1929 Round 13	Basel	2–2	Young Boys	Landhof, Basel
15:00	Schlecht 49' (1:0); Bielser 60' (2:0)	Summary	80' (2:1) Schicker; 85' (2:2) Schicker	Attendance: 5,500; Referee: (Switzerland) Enderli Winterthur

14 April 1929 Round 14	Old Boys	2–2	Basel	Stadion Schützenmatte, Basel
15:00	Bossi (pen. 1:0); Müller 41' (2:2)	Summary	34' (1:1) Müller; 35' (1:2) Strasser	Attendance: 2,000; Referee: (Switzerland) Calpini Sion

28 April 1929 Round 15	Nordstern Basel	2–1	Basel	Stadion Rankhof, Basel
15:00	Flubacher 42' (1:0); Breitenstein 80' (2:1)	Summary	70' (1:1) Bielser	Attendance: 4,000; Referee: (Switzerland) Kempf

20 May 1929 Round 16	Aarau	2–2	Basel	Stadion Brügglifeld, Aarau
	Vaccani 56' (1:1); Wernli 68' (pen. 2:1)	Summary	23' (0:1) Schaub; 80' (2:2) Schaub	Attendance: 1,100; Referee: (Switzerland) Edm. Dizerens Lausanne

==== Central Group table ====
Pos	Team	Pld	W	D	L	GF	GA	GD	Pts	Qualification
1	Young Boys	16	8	5	3	34	22	+12	21	Group winners / Advance to finals
2	Basel	16	8	4	4	48	32	+16	20	
3	Nordstern Basel	16	8	2	6	46	32	+14	18	
4	FC Bern	16	8	2	6	29	29	0	18	
5	Concordia Basel	16	8	1	7	33	30	+3	17	
6	Grenchen	16	6	2	8	20	24	−4	14	
7	Old Boys	16	5	3	8	29	32	−3	13	
8	Solothurn	16	5	2	9	34	49	−15	12	
9	Aarau	16	4	3	9	26	49	−23	11	Relegation play-off

Source: rsssf.com

=== Swiss Cup ===
2 September 1928 Preliminary round	Basel	1–0	Baden	Landhof, Basel
10:30	Enderlin (I) 80' (1:0)	Summary		Referee: (Switzerland) Feurer Delémont

7 October 1928 First round	Basel	10–2	Bülach	Landhof, Basel
15:00	Schlecht 3' (1:0); Bielser 30' (2:1); Enderlin (I) 50' (pen. 3:1); Enderlin (I) 51' (4:1); Strasser 54' (5:1); Bielser 57' (6:1); Bielser 61' (7:1); Enderlin (I) 62' (8:1); Bielser 70' (9:2); Schlecht 80' (10:2)	Summary	10' (1:1) Mattenleger; 67' (8:2) Rüegg	Referee: (Switzerland) Karl Wunderlin Basel

4 November 1928 Second round	Basel	2–3	Concordia Basel	Landhof, Basel
14:30	Enderlin (I) 52' (1:2); Müller 55' (2:2)	Summary	16' (0:1) Christen; 35' (0:2) Ehrenbolger (I); 83' (2:3) Christen	Attendance: 3,580; Referee: (Switzerland) Spengler Olten

== See also ==
- History of FC Basel
- List of FC Basel players
- List of FC Basel seasons

== Sources ==
- Rotblau: Jahrbuch Saison 2014/2015. Publisher: FC Basel Marketing AG. ISBN 978-3-7245-2027-6
- Die ersten 125 Jahre. Publisher: Josef Zindel im Friedrich Reinhardt Verlag, Basel. ISBN 978-3-7245-2305-5
- FCB team 1928–29 at fcb-archiv.ch
- Switzerland 1928-29 at RSSSF
