= 1929–30 Swiss Cup =

Tournament details
- Country: Switzerland
- Teams: 117

Final positions
- Champions: Young Boys
- Runners-up: Aarau

The 1929–30 Swiss Cup was the 5th edition of Switzerland's football cup competition, organised annually since the 1925–26 season by the Swiss Football Association.

== Overview ==
=== Preamble ===
In Switzerland, after the end of the first world war, the 1920s saw a rapid rise in the popularity of top-level football and also a decade of rapid growth in grassroots football and many new football clubs were formed. By the mid-1920s, every larger Swiss town had a football pitch and its own football club. Top level organised football also experienced a boom and the larger already existing clubs were also expanding and growing. Between 1922 and 1930, twelve new football stadiums were built, each with a capacity of over 10,000 spectators. Furthermore, semi- and fully professional football players began to emerge and transfer fees started to become a reality.

The structure of the Swiss championships provided a top-tier Serie A with 27 teams (3 regional groups of 9 clubs) and a second-tier Promotion Series with 54 teams divided into 6 groups. From the third-tier the football system was arranged in the regional leagues, named Serie B, C and D. However, the Swiss league system was suffering a crisis and this had expand during the previous few years. There were continuous disagreements between smaller and larger clubs. These were mainly concerning promotion/relegation procedures which included play-offs between lower-tier group winners and upper-tier group losers. Things came to a peak in exactly this season, due to the fact that at the end of this season there was to be no promotion/relegation between the top two tiers. At this years AGM, held in July, the Swiss Football and Athletics Federation (SFAV), as the Swiss Football Association used to call itself, then decided to reorganise the structures of their championships and that the first, second and third tiers would be re-arranged. The new league would start in 1931. Not only the promotion/relegation procedures were causing discussions, but also due to the expanding professionalism there were differences. The larger clubs continuously contested to take over the better players from thr lower tier clubs by offering the players a wage or at least would offer them semi-professional status, combined with new, better paid jobs with firms who had commercial ties with the club.

=== Format ===
The Cup competition that had been introduced four years earlier to relieve these rising differences, was proving to be a success. This season 117 clubs applied to join the cup competition and, therefore, it began with a preliminary round with 53 matches, before the main competition began. This qualifying round, with a few exceptions, was played at the end of August and first week-end of September 1930 in advance of the league season. The first principal round was played, with one exception on Sunday 13 October. The competition was to be completed on Sunday 23 March 1930, with the final, which this year took place in the capital Bern, at the former Wankdorf Stadium.

Each club could enter only one team to the competition, reserve teams were not admitted to the competition. The matches were played in a knockout format. In the event of a draw after 90 minutes, the match went into extra time. In the event of a draw at the end of extra time, if agreed between the clubs, a second extra time was played. If the score was still level at the final whistle, a replay was foreseen and this was played on the visiting team's pitch. If no replay was agreed or the replay ended in a draw after extra time, a toss of a coin would establish the team that qualified for the next round.

== Preliminary round ==
=== Summary ===
Team 1	Score	Team 2
18 August 1929
Sion	0–4	Étoile-Sporting
24 August 1929
Zürich	10–2	SC Veltheim (Winterthur)
25 August 1929
Lausanne-Sport	2–1 (a.e.t.)	FC Tavannes
Young Boys	9–0	Concordia Yverdon
Bern	9–1	FC Tramelan
Cantonal Neuchâtel	2–6	Etoile Carouge
FC Madretsch (Biel)	2–1	FC Viktoria Bern
FC Gloria (Le Locle)	1–5	Urania Genève Sport
Brühl	3–1	Concordia Basel
FC Olten	2–9	Old Boys
Basel	6–2	FC Diana Zürich
Chiasso	3–2	Kickers Luzern
Winterthur	7–1	FC Fortuna (SG)
Blue Stars	8–0	SV Sissach
1 September 1929
Sparta Schaffhausen	1–3	Frauenfeld
FC Münchenstein	2–6	VfR Kleinhüningen
FC Buchs	1–2	FC Allschwil
FC Birsfelden	5–0	Helvetik Basel
FC Romanshorn	0–1	FC Töss (Winterthur)
Locarno	4–2	FC Neumünster Zürich
FC Altstetten (Zürich)	1–3	Bülach
FC Amriswil	5–3	FC Rheinfelden
Spielvereinigung Schaffhausen	1–3	Giovanni Calciatori Luganesi
Bellinzona	2–6	FC Oerlikon (ZH)
Black Stars	4–2	FC Breite (Basel)
Juventus Zürich	8–4	Wohlen
Baden	3–1	Uster
FC Horgen	1–7	SV Seebach (Zürich)
FC Industrie	2–3	Kreuzlingen
Red Star	0–2	FC Adliswil
FC Schlieren	1–8	Luzern
FC Dietikon	1–3	Chur
FC Höngg	4–1	FC Thalwil
Sirius Zürich	3–0	FC Lenzburg
Delémont	2–7	FC Bözingen
Couvet-Sports	8–0	Sylva-Sports (Le Locle)
FC Renens	5–0	Racing-Club Lausanne
Montreux-Sports	9–1	FC Forward Morges
FC Chailly	2–5	FC Yverdon
Olympia-Sports Vevey	2–1	FC Länggasse (Bern)
Central Fribourg	4–1	FC Jonction (Genève)
FC Helvetia Bern	3–0	FC Le Parc (La Chaux-de-Fonds)
Sports Boys Bern	7–1	Thun
Cercle des Sports Bienne	2–5	Stade Nyonnais
FC Langenthal	0–3	Vevey Sports
Minerva Bern	8–2	FC Biberist
Zähringia Bern	3–2	Villeneuve-Sports
Xamax-Sports (Neuchâtel)	1–7	Monthey
CAA Genève	3–0	FC Fleurier
FC Nidau	5–1	FC Stade Payerne
FC Reconvilier	3–2	St-Imier Sports
8 September 1929
FC Liestal	2–5	CS La Tour-de-Peilz
6 October 1929
Stade Lausanne	4–1	Grenchen

=== Matches ===
24 August 1929
16:30

Zürich	10–2	SC Veltheim (Winterthur)
Baumeister 30' (1:0); A. Lehmann (2:0); Baumeister 63' (3:1); Baumeister (4:1); Baumeister (5:1); Girelli (og 6:1); Girelli (og 7:1); Stelzer (8:1); A. Lehmann (9:1); A. Lehmann (10:1)	FCZ summary	50' (2:1) Bischioni (10:2)

Letzigrund, Zürich
Referee: (Switzerland) Stirnemann (Aarau)
- Zürich played the 1929/30 season in the Serie A (top-tier), Veltheim in the Serie Promotion (second tier).

15 August 1929
10:30

Basel	6–2	FC Diana Zürich
Bielser 25' (1:0); Enderlin (I) 35' (2:0); Müller (3:0); Müller (4:0); Wionsowsky (5:2); Enderlin (I) (6:2)	FCB summary	(4:1) (4:2)

Landhof, Basel
Attendance: 1,000
Referee: (Switzerland) Bitterli (Baden)
- Basel played the 1929/30 season in the Serie A (top-tier), Diana Zürich in the Serie B (third tier).

== First principal round ==
=== Summary ===
Team 1	Score	Team 2
6 October 1929
Winterthur	2–1	FC Birsfelden
13 October 1929
Etoile Carouge	6–2	FC Helvetia Bern
Olympia-Sports Vevey	1–3	Bern
Minerva Bern	0–6	Biel-Bienne
Étoile-Sporting	6–2	Monthey
Servette	9–1	Zähringia Bern
FC Reconvilier	2–3 (a.e.t.)	FC Yverdon
Couvet-Sports	4–2 (a.e.t.)	Fribourg
Urania Genève Sport	3–1	Renens-Sports
Young Boys	2–0	Vevey Sports
FC Madretsch (Biel)	6–3 (a.e.t.)	Solothurn
La Chaux-de-Fonds	6–1	Lausanne-Sport
CS La Tour-de-Peilz	2–7	Montreux-Sports
Aarau	7–4 (a.e.t.)	FC Bözingen
Stade Nyonnais	3–1	Sports-Boys Bern
CAA Genève	4–2	Central Fribourg
FC Nidau	3–1	Stade Lausanne
Grasshopper Club	9–2	FC Oerlikon (ZH)
SCI Juventus Zürich	6–1	Bülach
Young Fellows	6–0	Baden
Chiasso	3–1	Black Stars
Blue Stars	8–0	Kreuzlingen
SV Seebach	0–4	Lugano
Basel	10–0	FC Dietikon
Zürich	4–2	Old Boys
FC Adliswil	5–2	VfR Kleinhüningen
Nordstern	4–0	Sirius Zürich
SV Höngg	3–2	FC Amriswil
Locarno	3–2	Luzern
FC Töss (Winterthur)	0–1	St. Gallen
FC Allschwil	5–3	Frauenfeld
Giovanni Calciatori Luganesi	5–1	Brühl

=== Matches ===
13 October 1929

Servette	9–1	Zähringia Bern
3x Passello; 2x Oswald; 3x Beretta; 1x (o.g.)	Servette summary	Goal

Parc des Sports, Geneva
- Servette played the 1929/30 season in the Serie A (top-tier), Zähringia in the Serie B (third tier).

13 October 1929

Aarau	7–4 (a.e.t.)	FC Bözingen
Goal	FCA summary	Goal

Stadion Brügglifeld, Aarau
Attendance: 1,000
- Aarau played the 1929/30 season in the Serie A (top-tier), Bözingen in the Serie B (third tier).

13 October 1929
10:45

Basel	10–0	FC Dietikon
Enderlin (I) 7' (1:0); Bielser 10' (2:0); Bielser 16' (3:0); Bielser 19' (4:0); Wionsowsky 34' (5:0); Galler (6:0); Strasser 55' (7:0); Müller 60' (8:0); Bielser 61' (9:0); Bielser 75' (10:0)	FCB summary

Landhof, Basel
Attendance: 1,800
Referee: (Switzerland) Krämer (Basel)
- Basel played the 1929/30 season in the Serie A (top-tier), Dietikon in the Serie B (third tier).

13 October 1929

Zürich	4–2	Old Boys
Romberg 36' (1:0); Nyffeler 40' (2:0); Baumeister 48' (3:0); A. Lehmann 90' (4:2)	FCZ summary	50' (3:1) Bossi; 60' (3:2) Kies

Letzigrund, Zürich
Attendance: 3,000
Referee: (Switzerland)
- Both teams played the 1929/30 season in the Serie A (top-tier).

== Round 2 ==
=== Summary ===
Team 1	Score	Team 2
3 November 1929
Etoile Carouge	3–0	Bern
Biel-Bienne	4–2	Étoile-Sporting
Servette	6–0	FC Yverdon
Couvet-Sports	0–6	Urania Genève Sport
Young Boys	6–1	FC Madretsch (Biel)
La Chaux-de-Fonds	4–3	Montreux-Sports
Aarau	8–1	Stade Nyonnais
CAA Genève	3–2	FC Nidau
Grasshopper Club	12–1	Juventus Zürich
Young Fellows	1–0	Chiasso
Winterthur	1–2	Blue Stars
Lugano	3–5	Basel
Zürich	12–1	FC Adliswil
Nordstern	7–0	SV Höngg
Locarno	4–2	St. Gallen
FC Allschwil	2–3 (a.e.t.)	GC Luganesi

=== Matches ===
3 November 1929

Servette	6–0	FC Yverdon
3x Passello; 1x Beretta; 2x Rüegg	Servette summary

Parc des Sports, Geneva
- Servette played the 1929/30 season in the Serie A (top-tier), Yverdon in the Serie B (third tier).

3 November 1929

Aarau	8–1	Stade Nyonnais
Goal	FCA summary	Goal

Stadion Brügglifeld, Aarau
Attendance: 1,000
- Aarau played the 1929/30 season in the Serie A (top-tier), Stade Nyonnais in the Serie Promotion (second tier).

3 November 1929

Lugano	3–5	Basel
Fink 39' (1:1); Fink 81' (2:3); Sturzenegger 80' (3:4)	FCB summary	31' (0:1) Müller; 41' (1:2) Schlecht; 54' (1:3) Bielser; 79' (2:4) Wionsowsky; 85' (3:5) Enderlin (I)

Campo Marzio, Lugano
Attendance: 2,500
Referee: (Switzerland) Paschoud (Bern)
- Both teams played the 1929/30 season in the Serie A (top-tier).

3 November 1929
10:00

Zürich	12–1	FC Adliswil
A. Lehmann 4' (1:0); Romberg 9' (2:0); Romberg (3:0); Baumeister 30' (4:0); Clérico (5:0); Romberg (6:0); Baumeister 37' (7:0); Romberg (8:0); A. Lehmann (9:0); A. Lehmann 80' (10:1); Romberg (11:1); Baumeister 90' (12:1)	FCZ summary	(9:1)

Letzigrund, Zürich
Referee: Meuche (Schlieren, Switzerland)
- In the early morning hours of that day, the Letzigrund grandstand burned down. When the match began at 10 a.m., the city and Altstetten fire services were still busy extinguishing and cleaning up after the fire.
- Zürich played the 1929/30 season in the Serie A (top-tier), Adliswil in the Serie B (third tier).

== Round 3 ==
=== Summary ===
Team 1	Score	Team 2
1 December 1929
Grasshopper Club	3–2	Blue Stars
Urania Genève Sport	2–3	Biel-Bienne
Young Boys	10–3	CAA Genève
Aarau	5–1	La Chaux-de-Fonds
GC Luganesi	1–3	Young Fellows
Locarno	5–4	Basel
Nordstern	0–3	Zürich
22 December 1929
Etoile Carouge	3–0	Servette

=== Matches ===
1 December 1929

Grasshopper Club	3–2	Blue Stars
De Weck 22' (1:0); De Weck 24' (2:0); W. Weiler 35' (pen.)	RSSSF summary	60' (3:1) Pfetsch; 78' (3:0) Baumann

Sportplatz Hardturmstrasse, Zürich
- Both teams played the 1929/30 season in the Serie A (top-tier).

1 December 1929

Urania Genève Sport	2–3	Biel-Bienne
Barrière 65' (1:2); Berchten	RSSSF summary	25' (0:1) Wüthrich; 50' (0:2) Grimm; Joseph

Stade de Frontenex, Genève
- Both teams played the 1929/30 season in the Serie A (top-tier).

1 December 1929

Young Boys	10–3	CAA Genève
4x Jung; 2x Volery; 3x Dasen	RSSSF summary	Jolliet; Jolliet; Rentsik

Wankdorf Stadium, Bern
- Young Boys played the 1929/30 season in the Serie A (top-tier), CAA Genève in the Serie Promotion (second tier).

1 December 1929

Aarau	5–1	La Chaux-de-Fonds
2x Lüthy II; 2x Taddei; 1x Hochstrasser	FCA summary	40' Held

Stadion Brügglifeld, Aarau
Attendance: 1,500
- Both teams played the 1929/30 season in the Serie A (top-tier).

1 December 1929

Giovanni Calciatori Luganesi	1–3	Young Fellows
Domeniconi	RSSSF summary	Diebold; Noldin; Winkler (III)

Campo Marzio, Lugano
- CG Luganesi played the 1929/30 season in the Serie B (third tier), Young Fellows in the Serie A (top-tier).

1 December 1929
14:45

Locarno	5–4	Basel
(1:0); Case (II) (2:3); Case (II) (3:3); Mutter 70' (4:3); Mutter 75' (5:3)	FCB summary	(1:1) Enderlin (I) (1:2) Schlecht (1:3) Schlecht; 88' (5:4) Wionsowsky

Campo Sportivo Alle Palestre, Locarno
Attendance: 1,000
Referee: (Switzerland) Ferdinand Allemann (Biel/Bienne)
- Locarno played the 1929/30 season in the Serie Promotion (second tier) and at the end of the seasons became second tier champions.
- Basel played the 1929/30 season in the Serie A (top-tier).

1 December 1929

Nordstern	0–3	Zürich
	FCZ summary	22' (0:1) Romberg; 77' (0:2) Nyffeler; 85' (0:3) Baumeister

Rankhof, Basel
Attendance: 2,000
Referee: (Switzerland) Calpini (Sion)
- Both teams played the 1929/30 season in the Serie A (top-tier).

22 December 1929

Etoile Carouge	3–0	Servette
Rey 17' (1:0); Rey 60' (2:0); Losio 65' (pen.)	Servette summary

Stade de la Fontenette, Carouge
- Both teams played the 1929/30 season in the Serie A (top-tier).

== Quarter-finals ==
=== Summary ===
Team 1	Score	Team 2
2 February 1930
Grasshopper Club	1–4	Zürich
Etoile Carouge	ppd	Young Fellows
Aarau	2–2 (a.e.t.)	Biel-Bienne
Locarno	2–2 (a.e.t.)	Young Boys

Resheduled

Team 1	Score	Team 2
16 February 1930
Etoile Carouge	3–2	Young Fellows

Replays

Team 1	Score	Team 2
16 February 1930
Biel-Bienne	2–3	Aarau
Young Boys	2–1	Locarno

=== Matches ===
2 February 1930

Grasshopper Club	1–4	Zürich
Adam 30' (1:1)	FCZ summary	4' (0:1) Baumeister; 42' (1:2) Romberg; 74' (1:3) A. Lehmann; 86' (1:4) Romberg

Hardturm, Zürich
Attendance: 8,000
Referee: (Switzerland) Paschoud (Bern)

2 February 1930

Aarau	2–2 (a.e.t.)	Biel-Bienne
Lüthy II 5' (1:0); Vaccani 34' (2:2)	FCA summary	11' (1:1) Strasser; 24' (1:2) Grimm

Stadion Brügglifeld, Aarau
Attendance: 4,000

16 February 1930
Replay

Biel-Bienne	2–3	Aarau
Hirt 4' (1:0); Buffat 35'	FCA summary	(1:1) Vaccani; Vaccani; K. Lüthy

Stadion Gurzelen, Biel/Bienne
Attendance: 4,000

2 February 1930

Locarno	2–2 (a.e.t.)	Young Boys
Imhof; Carminati	RSSSF summary	Volery; Volery

Stadio comunale Lido, Locarno

16 February 1930
Replay

Young Boys	2–1	Locarno
Volery 3' (1:0); Jung 35' (2:1)	RSSSF summary	20' (1:1) Cavallini

Wankdorf Stadium, Bern

16 February 1930
Rescheduled

Etoile Carouge	3–2	Young Fellows
Rey 20' (1:0); Losio 67'; Buchoux 90' (3:2)	RSSSF summary	(o.g.) (Crosetti); Lohrer

Stade de la Fontenette, Carouge

== Semi-finals ==
=== Summary ===
Team 1	Score	Team 2
2 March 1930
Etoile Carouge	2–4	Young Boys
Zürich	1–2	Aarau

=== Matches ===
2 March 1930

Etoile Carouge	2–4	Young Boys
Arn 18' (1:0) (Baumgartner) 66' (og 2:3)	RSSSF summary	26' (1:1) Wysard; 36' (1:2) Schicker; 43' (pen. 1:3); 68' (2:4) Dasen

Stade de la Fontenette, Carouge
Attendance: 7,000
Referee: (Switzerland) Hans Enderli (Winterthur)

2 March 1930
14:45

Zürich	1–2	Aarau
Spiller 64' (1:1)	FCZ summary	23' (0:1) K. Lüthy; 69' (1:2) Taddei

Hardturm, Zürich
Attendance: 10,000
Referee: (Switzerland) René Mercet (Locarno and Lausanne)

== Final ==
The final was held in the former Wankdorf Stadium in Bern on Sunday 23 March 1930.

=== Summary ===
Team 1	Score	Team 2
23 March 1930
Young Boys	1–0	Aarau

=== Telegram ===
23 March 1930

Young Boys	1–0	Aarau
Jung 15' (1:0)	Fussball-Schweiz summary

Wankdorf Stadium, Bern
Attendance: 7,500
Referee: (Switzerland) René Mercet (Locarno and Lausanne)

Young Boys won the cup and this was the club's first cup title to this date.

== Further in Swiss football ==
- 1929–30 Swiss Serie A
- 1929–30 FC Basel season

== Sources ==
- Fussball-Schweiz
- Switzerland 1929–30 at RSSSF

Preceded by 1928–29	Swiss Cup seasons	Succeeded by 1930–31
