= 1928–29 Swiss Cup =

Tournament details
- Country: Switzerland
- Teams: 105

Final positions
- Champions: Urania Genève Sport
- Runners-up: Young Boys

The 1928–29 Swiss Cup was the 4th edition of Switzerland's football cup competition, organised annually since the 1925–26 season by the Swiss Football Association.

== Overview ==
=== Preamble ===
In Switzerland, after the end of the first world war, the 1920s saw a rapid rise in the popularity of top-level football and also a decade of rapid growth in grassroots football and many new football clubs were formed. By the mid-1920s, every larger Swiss town had a football pitch and its own football club. Top level organised football also experienced a boom and the larger already existing clubs were also expanding and growing. Between 1922 and 1930, twelve new football stadiums were built, each with a capacity of over 10,000 spectators. Furthermore, semi- and fully professional football players began to emerge and transfer fees started to become a reality.

The structure of the Swiss championships provided a top-tier Serie A with 27 teams (3 groups of 9 clubs) and a second-tier Promotion Series with 54 teams divided into 8 groups (4 groups of 8 teams, 1 group with 7 and 1 group with nine teams). From the third-tier the football system was arranged in the regional leagues, named Serie B, C and D. However, the Swiss league system was suffering a crisis and this would expand further during the following years. There were continuous disagreements between smaller and larger clubs. These were mainly concerning promotion/relegation procedures which included play-offs between lower-tier group winners and upp-tier group losers. Not only that, but also due to the expanding professionalism, because the larger clubs would contest for the better players by offering them a wage.

=== Format ===
This season 105 clubs applied for participation for the Swiss Cup. Therefore, the preliminary round was expanded to 82 teams. These played a knock out round for a slot in the first principal round. This expansion, therefore, required that selected top-tier clubs also had to compete in the preliminary round and this again caused further irritations and disagreements.

This season's cup competition began with the preliminary round, which was held in advance of the main competition. This qualifying round, with one exception, was played on the first Sunday in September 1928 and one week in advance of the league season. The first principal round was played, with one exception on Sunday 7 October. The competition was to be completed on Whit Monday 1930 with the final, which this year took place at the Stade de Frontenex in Genève.

Reserve teams were not admitted to the competition. The matches were played in a knockout format. In the event of a draw after 90 minutes, the match went into extra time. In the event of a draw at the end of extra time, if agreed between the clubs, a second extra time was played. If the score was still level at the final whistle, a replay was foreseen and this was played on the visiting team's pitch. If no replay was agreed or the replay ended in a draw after extra time, a toss of a coin would establish the team that qualified for the next round.

== Preliminary round ==
The lower league teams that had not qualified for the main competition competed here in a knockout qualification round. Selected top-tier clubs also had to compete in the preliminary round. The aim of this preliminary stage was to reduce the number of lower league teams before the first round was played. The winners of the qualification were to join the other clubs from the top-tier that were automatically qualified. The draw in the preliminary stage and in the early rounds of the main competition respected local regionalities. The qualification round was played in advance of the lower leagues regional season.

=== Summary ===
Team 1	Score	Team 2
26 August 1928
Spielvereinigung Schaffhausen	0–0 (a.e.t.)	FC Münchenstein
2 September 1928
Luzern	5–0	Juventus Zürich
Kickers Luzern	6–2	SC Kleinhüningen
FC Oerlikon (ZH)	5–0	FC Neumünster (ZH)
Helvetik Basel	1–2	FC Altstetten (Zürich)
Wohlen	3–2	SC Zug
FC Birsfelden	2–1	FC Langenthal
Uster	3–1	SC Veltheim (Winterthur)
Basel	1–0	Baden
FC Allschwil	3–2	FC Amriswil
Lugano	13–0	FC Romanshorn
SV Seebach (Zürich)	3–4	Frauenfeld
Winterthurer Sportverein	3–1	Red Star
Sparta Schaffhausen	2–3	Black Stars
Giovanni Calciatori Luganesi	7–1	FC Breite (Basel)
FC Sissach	2–4	Bülach
Winterthur	2–0	FC Töss (Winterthur)
Locarno	10–1	Hakoah Zürich
FC Adliswil	2–3	FC Thalwil
Sirius Zürich	4–2	SV Höngg
Minerva Bern	10–1	La Côte-Sport Rolle
FC Bex	3–8	Stade Lausanne
FC Yverdon	1–4	FC Viktoria Bern
Sainte-Croix-Sports	4–2	Cercle des Sports Bienne
Stade Nyonnais	1–2	Delémont
FC Bözingen	2–5	FC Gloria-Sports (Le Locle)
FC Länggasse (Bern)	3–1	Couvet-Sports
Lancy-Champagne-Sport	1–6	FC Le Locle
FC Jonction (Genève)	3–2 (a.e.t.)	Lausanne-Sport
Fribourg	3–1	Sport Boys Bern
Vevey Sports	5–1	Villeneuve-Sports
FC Nidau	6–2	FC Reconvilier
FC Olten	4–1	FC Orbe
FC Tavannes	2–1	CAA Genève
Sylva-Sports (Le Locle)	3–1	FC Renens
FC Tramelan	6–5	Monthey
Concordia Yverdon	4–0	Central Fribourg
FC Xamax (Neuchâtel)	1–0	FC Forward Morges
FC Fleurier	2–5	Zähringia Bern
FC Madretsch (Biel)	8–6	Montreux-Sports
CS La Tour-de-Peilz	2–1	Racing-Club Lausanne

Replay

Team 1	Score	Team 2
2 September 1928
FC Münchenstein	5–3	Spielvereinigung Schaffhausen

=== Matches ===
2 September 1928
10:30

Basel	1–0	Baden
Enderlin (I) 80' (1:0)	FCB summary

Landhof, Basel
Referee: (Switzerland) Feurer (Delémont)
- Basel played the 1928/29 season in the Serie A (top-tier), Baden in the Serie Promotion (second tier).

== First principal round ==
The winners of the qualification round were to join the clubs from the lower leagues that had already qualified and the teams from the top-tier, most of which were automatically qualified. The draw in the early rounds of the main competition respected local regionalities, whenever possible.

=== Summary ===
Team 1	Score	Team 2
16 September 1928
Urania Genève Sport	3–0	FC Nidau
7 October 1928
Servette	10–0	Zähringia Bern
FC Jonction (Genève)	2–0	FC Gloria (Le Locle)
Biel-Bienne	2–1	Bern
Grenchen	5–1	FC Olten
La Chaux-de-Fonds	2–5	FC Madretsch (Biel)
Solothurn	8–4	Sylva-Sports (Le Locle)
FC Tramelan	2–8	Étoile-Sporting
Sainte-Croix-Sports	1–2	Fribourg
Cantonal Neuchâtel	3–0	CS La Tour-de-Peilz
Minerva Bern	2–1	Etoile Carouge
Young Boys	7–0	FC Xamax (Neuchâtel)
Concordia Yverdon	3–1	FC Le Locle
Stade Lausanne	6–2	Delémont
FC Tavannes	8–1	Vevey Sports
FC Länggasse (Bern)	0–3	FC Viktoria Bern
St. Gallen	0–4	SC Veltheim (Winterthur)
Aarau	2–1	Nordstern
Brühl	3–4	Young Fellows
Wohlen	1–4	Grasshopper Club
Black Stars	0–1	Blue Stars
Locarno	3–1	Old Boys
Winterthurer Sportverein	2–4	Chiasso
FC Münchenstein	1–9 *	Zürich
Uster	0–11	Lugano
Concordia Basel	14–4	FC Thalwil
Basel	10–2	Bülach
Kickers Luzern	6–4	FC Oerlikon (ZH)
Frauenfeld	1–2	FC Liestal
Giovanni Calciatori Luganesi	4–2	FC Allschwil
Luzern	4–1	FC Altstetten (Zürich)
Sirius Zürich	1–6	FC Birsfelden

- Note the match Münchenstein–Zürich was played in Zürich.

=== Matches ===
7 October 1928

Servette	10–0	Zähringia Bern
1x Röthlisberger; 2x Landi; 4x Passello; 2x Lüthy; 1x Garibaldi	Servette summary

Parc des Sports, Geneva
- Servette played the 1928/29 season in the Serie A (top-tier), Zähringia in the Serie B (third tier).

7 October 1928

Aarau	2–1	Nordstern
Goal	FCA summary	Goal

- Both teams played the 1928/29 season in the Serie A (top-tier).

7 October 1928
13:15

FC Münchenstein	9–1	Zürich
Cordazzo (3:1)	FCZ summary	15' (1:0) A. Lehmann (2:0) A. Lehmann (3:0) A. Lehmann (4:1) Kaspar (5:1) A. Lehmann (6:1) A. Lehmann (7:1) A. Lehmann (8:1) A. Lehmann; (penalty missed) Heinrich (9:1) A. Lehmann

Letzigrund, Zürich
Attendance: 600
Referee: (Switzerland) Hirt (Zürich)
- Note the match Münchenstein–Zürich was played in Zürich.
- Münchenstein played the 1928/29 season in the Serie B (third tier), Zürich in the Serie A (top-tier).

7 October 1928
15:00

Basel	10–2	Bülach
Schlecht 3' (1:0); Bielser 30' (2:1); Enderlin (I) 50' (pen. 3:1); Enderlin (I) 51' (4:1); Strasser 54' (5:1); Bielser 57' (6:1); Bielser 61' (7:1); Enderlin (I) 62' (8:1); Bielser 70' (9:2); Schlecht 80' (10:2)	FCB summary	10' (1:1) Mattenleger; 67' (8:2) Rüegg

Landhof, Basel
Referee: (Switzerland) Karl Wunderlin (Basel)
- Basel played the 1928/29 season in the Serie A (top-tier), Bülach in the Serie B (third tier).

== Round 2 ==
=== Summary ===
Team 1	Score	Team 2
4 November 1928
Locarno	1–2	Giovanni Calciatori Luganesi
Luzern	4–1	FC Birsfelden
Aarau	0–2	Young Fellows
Kickers Luzern	1–4	Zürich
Lugano	5–1	Grasshopper Club
Basel	2–3	Concordia Basel
Blue Stars	1–3	FC Liestal
Cantonal Neuchâtel	3–1	Stade Lausanne
Fribourg	5–1	FC Jonction (Genève)
FC Madretsch (Biel)	6–4	Solothurn
Biel-Bienne	5–0	Minerva Bern
Étoile-Sporting	3–0	Grenchen
Urania Genève Sport	2–2 (a.e.t.)	Servette
Young Boys	12–3	FC Viktoria Bern
Concordia Yverdon	2–3 (a.e.t.)	FC Tavannes
11 November 1928
Chiasso	2–4 (a.e.t.)	Winterthur

Replay

Team 1	Score	Team 2
18 November 1928
Servette	0–1 (a.e.t.)	Urania Genève Sport

=== Matches ===
4 November 1928

Aarau	0–2	Young Fellows
	FCA summary	Goal

Stadion Brügglifeld, Aarau
- Both teams played the 1928/29 season in the Serie A (top-tier).

4 November 1928

Kickers Luzern	1–4	Zürich
Gloor (1:4)	FCZ summary	12' (0:1) Eggler (2:0) Stelzer (0:3) A. Lehmann (0:4) Stelzer

(Lucerne)
Attendance: 2,000
Referee: (Switzerland) Afflerbach (Basel)
- Kickers Luzern played the 1928/29 season in the Serie Promotion (second tier), Zürich in the Serie A (top-tier).

4 November 1928
14:30

Basel	2–3	Concordia Basel
Enderlin (I) 52' (1:2); Müller 55' (2:2)	FCB summary	16' (0:1) Christen; 35' (0:2) Ehrenbolger (I); 83' (2:3) Christen

Landhof, Basel
Attendance: 3,580
Referee: (Switzerland) Alfred Spengler (Olten)
- Both teams played the 1928/29 season in the Serie A (top-tier).

4 November 1928

Urania Genève Sport	2–2 (a.e.t.)	Servette
Goal	Servette summary	Dorsaz; Passello

Stade de Frontenex, Genève
- Both teams played the 1928/29 season in the Serie A (top-tier).

18 November 1928
Replay

Servette	0–1 (a.e.t.)	Urania Genève Sport
	Servette summary	Goal

Parc des Sports, Geneva

== Round 3 ==
=== Summary ===
Team 1	Score	Team 2
2 December 1928
Luzern	0–2	Lugano
FC Liestal	2–3	Giovanni Calciatori Luganesi
Winterthur	5–3	Zürich
Young Fellows	0–1	Concordia Basel
Cantonal Neuchâtel	1–0	FC Tavannes
Young Boys	5–0	FC Madretsch (Biel)
Biel-Bienne	2–3	Étoile-Sporting
Fribourg	ppd	Urania Genève Sport

Rescheduled

Team 1	Score	Team 2
6 January 1929
Urania Genève Sport	2–0	Fribourg

=== Matches ===
2 December 1928

Luzern	0–2	Lugano
	RSSSF summary	14' (0:1) Fink (0:2) Hintermann

Sportplatz Allmend, Lucerne
- Luzern played the 1928/29 season in the Serie Promotion (second tier), Zürich in the Serie A (top-tier).

2 December 1928

FC Liestal	2–3	Giovanni Calciatori Luganesi
Goal	RSSSF summary	Donizetti; Andreoni; Morandi

Sportplatz Gitterli, Liestal
- Liestal played the 1928/29 season in the Serie Promotion (second tier), GC Luganesi in the Serie B (third tier).

2 December 1928

Winterthur	5–3	Zürich
Martin I 2' (1:1); Huber (2:2); Küng (3:2); Keller (4:3); Küng (5:3)	FCZ summary	1' (0:1) Stelzer (1:2) A. Lehmann; 61' (3:3) A. Lehmann

Stadion Schützenwiese, Winterthur
- Both teams played the 1928/29 season in the Serie A (top-tier).

2 December 1928

Young Fellows	0–1	Concordia Basel
	RSSSF summary	77' (0:1) Ehrenbolger (I)

Utogrund, Zürich
- Both teams played the 1928/29 season in the Serie A (top-tier).

2 December 1928

Cantonal Neuchâtel	1–0	FC Tavannes
Struppler 65' (1:0)	RSSSF summary

Stade de la Maladière, Neuchâtel
- Cantonal played the 1928/29 season in the Serie A (top-tier), Tavannes in the Serie B (third tier).

2 December 1928

Young Boys	5–0	FC Madretsch (Biel)
Dasen 3' (1:0); Streun 5' (2:0) (3:0) (4:0); Baldi (6:0)	RSSSF summary

Wankdorf Stadium, Bern
- Young Boys played the 1928/29 season in the Serie A (top-tier), Madretsch in the Serie Promotion (second tier).

2 December 1928

Biel-Bienne	2–3	Étoile-Sporting
von Gunten 36' (1:2); Imhof 78' (2:3)	RSSSF summary	3' (0:1) Treyball; 7' (0:2) Matzinger; 60' (1:3) Matzinger

Stadion Gurzelen, Biel/Bienne
- Both teams played the 1928/29 season in the Serie A (top-tier).

6 January 1929

Urania Genève Sport	2–0	Fribourg
Grettler; Gremminger 80' (2:0)	RSSSF summary

Stade de Frontenex, Genève
- Both teams played the 1928/29 season in the Serie A (top-tier).

== Quarter-finals ==
=== Summary ===
Team 1	Score	Team 2
27 January 1929
Cantonal Neuchâtel	1–2	Giovanni Calciatori Luganesi
3 February 1929
Urania Genève Sport	3–0	Winterthur
Étoile-Sporting	0–1	Young Boys
Concordia Basel	0–0 *	Lugano

- Note to match Concordia–Lugano: Result after 90 minutes. No extra time was played due to the bad condition of the pitch.

Replay

Team 1	Score	Team 2
10 February 1929
Lugano	0–2	Concordia Basel

=== Matches ===
27 January 1929

Cantonal Neuchâtel	1–2 (a.e.t.)	Giovanni Calciatori Luganesi
A. Abegglen 28' (1:0)	RSSSF summary	60' (1:1) Gambirasio; 118' (1:2) Andreoni

Stade de la Maladière, Neuchâtel

3 February 1929

Urania Genève Sport	3–0	Winterthur
Grettler 35' (1:0); Stalder (2:0); Barrière (3:0)	RSSSF summary

Stade de Frontenex, Genève

3 February 1929

Étoile-Sporting	0–1	Young Boys
	RSSSF summary	80' (0:1) Fässler

Terrain des Eplatures, La Chaux-de-Fonds

3 February 1929

Concordia Basel	0–0	Lugano
	RSSSF summary

Stadion Rankhof, Basel
- Note: This result was after 90 minutes. No extra time was played due to the bad condition of the pitch, thus a replay was required.

10 February 1929
Replay

Lugano	0–2	Concordia Basel
	RSSSF summary	82' (0:1) Christen; 85' (0:2) Dettwyler

Campo Marzio, Lugano

== Semi-finals ==
=== Summary ===
Team 1	Score	Team 2
3 March 1929
Young Boys	5–2	Giovanni Calciatori Luganesi
28 April 1929
Urania Genève Sport	2–1	Concordia Basel

=== Matches ===
3 March 1929

Young Boys	5–2	Giovanni Calciatori Luganesi
von Arx I 5' (1:0); Funk II 25' (2:1) von Arx II 37' (3:1); Dasen 69' (4:2); Dasen 79' (5:2)	RSSSF summary	6' (pen 1:1) Gilardoni; 42' (3:2) Andreoli

Wankdorf Stadium, Bern
Attendance: 4,500
Referee: (Switzerland) Kempf (Zürich)

28 April 1929

Urania Genève Sport	2–1	Concordia Basel
Grettler 20' (pen 1:0); Grettler 31' (2:0)	RSSSF summary	69' (2:1) Daetwyler

Stade de Frontenex, Genève
Attendance: 5,000
Referee: (Switzerland) Hans Enderli (Winterthur)

== Final ==
The final was held on Whit Monday 1930. The location for the final was decided by a toss of a coin between the two finalists. Urania Genève Sport won the draw and so the final was held at the Stade de Frontenex in Genève.

=== Summary ===
Team 1	Score	Team 2
20 May 1929
Urania Genève Sport	1–0	Young Boys

=== Telegram ===
20 May 1929
15:00

Urania Genève Sport	1–0	Young Boys
Barrière 17' (1:0)	Fussball-Schweiz summary

Stade de Frontenex, Genève
Attendance: 8,000
Referee: (Switzerland) Hans Enderli (Winterthur)

Urania Genève Sport won the cup and this was the club's first cup title.

== Further in Swiss football ==
- 1928–29 Swiss Serie A
- 1928–29 FC Basel season

== Sources ==
- Fussball-Schweiz
- Switzerland 1928–29 at RSSSF
- FCB Cup games 1927–28 at fcb-achiv.ch

Preceded by 1927–28	Swiss Cup seasons	Succeeded by 1929–30
