= 1929–30 FC Basel season =

FC Basel
1929–30 season
- Chairman: Otto Kuhn
- First team coach: Gyula Kertész
- Ground: Landhof, Basel
- Serie A: Group Stage: 1st Final Stage: 4th
- Swiss Cup: Round of 16
- Top goalscorer: League: Alfred Schlecht (13); All: Karl Bielser (19)
- Highest home attendance: 7,000 on 8 December 1929 vs Young Boys
- Lowest home attendance: 2,000 on 8 September 1929 vs Grenchen
- Average home league attendance: 3,750

The FC Basel 1929–30 season was their thirty seventh season since the club's foundation on 15 November 1893. FC Basel played their home games in the Landhof in the district Wettstein in Kleinbasel. The club's new chairman was former player Otto Kuhn who took over the presidency from Hans Rupprecht at the AGM on 6 July 1929.

== Overview ==
The former Hungarian international footballer Gyula Kertész was coach/manager for the second successive season. He coached the team in a total of 41 matches in their 1929–30 season. 20 of these matches were in the domestic league, 16 in the qualification round and four in the final round. Four matches were in the Swiss Cup and 17 games were friendly matches. Of these 17 friendlies three were played at home in the Landhof and the other 14 were away games. Of the 41 matches, 25 ended in a victory, six were drawn and 10 were defeats, 132 goals scored and 75 against.

At the end of the season Basel played a Scandinaviaen tour, with a visit in Germany, the first game in Leipzig and then six games in Norway. The team travelled with 15 players, the trainer Kertész and two functionaries. The journey started with a train ride on 2 June at 07:15 in the morning which arrived in Leipzig half passed eight that evening. The game against VfB Leipzig was played the following evening. The next day and ten hours the team travelled by train, train, ship, train and train again to Drammen, where a few hours later they played against a joint team Mjøndalen IF / SBK Drafn. The next day a train journey to Porsgrunn and two matches in 24 hours. The next day per bus and ship in a 48 hour journey to Bergen for a match against SK Brann. Again a ship voyage, this time to Stavanger and two games against Viking FK and a ship voyage back to Bergen. The journey ended with three train rides in three days, Bergen/Oslo/Berlin/Basel, arriving at home on 20 June. Seven games, four wins, one draw, two defeats and approximately 160 hours travelling.

The 1929–30 Swiss Serie A was divided into three regional groups, each group with nine teams. Due to the modification in the league system in the following season. The number of teams per group is to be increased from nine to eleven and therefore there were a few small modifications this season. The teams that won each group continue to the finals as before, but now these were accompanied by the second place teams as well. Due to the foreseen increase, during this season barrage games promotion-relegation (Serie A-Serie B) were not played, were not required. Basel were allocated to the Central group together with the other three local clubs Concordia Basel, Nordstern Basel and Old Boys Basel. The other five teams allocated to this group were Young Boys Bern, FC Bern, Aarau, Grenchen and Solothurn.

FC Basel played a good league season. The good work that the trainer Gyula Kertész was making with the players was shown in the results. The first five games were won straight off, including a 5–1 in Solothurn, a 4–1 against both FC Bern and Grenchen, a 3–0 against Aarau and a 1–0 victory against local rivals Old Boys. There was a slip in the match against there closest rivals Young Boys. But the team continued their good run in the new year, beating Solothurn 4–1 and even managing a 9–2 against FC Bern. Alfred Enderlin scored four goals in that match. Basel won ten matches, four were drawn and they suffered only two defeats. They scored 46 goals and conceded 20. With 24 points they ended the group in top position, two points ahead of runners-up Young Boys. FCB and YB continued to the final group. Here Basel played against Biel-Bienne and won, but lost the three matches against Lugano, Grasshopper Club and finally Servette, who won the Swiss championship. Basel finished the championship in fourth position, level on points with Lugano and YB.

In the preliminary, first and second round of the Swiss Cup Basel were drawn at home against FC Diana Zürich in August and FC Dietikon in October, then away against Lugano in November. But their second visit to the canton of Ticino in December ended in the away defeat against FC Locarno.

Basel's top league goal scorers were Alfred Schlecht with 13 goals and Karl Bielser with 12 goals. Followed by Alfred Enderlin with 10 and Walter Müller with eight. The players Otto Meier, Paul Schaub and Leopold Wionsowsky each scored once. Karl Bielser was top scorer in the Swiss Cup with seven goals, five of these were scored in the match against FC Dietikon

== Players ==
Squad members

Note: Flags indicate national team as defined under FIFA eligibility rules; some limited exceptions apply. Players may hold more than one non-FIFA nationality.

No.	Pos.	Nation	Player
—	GK	SUI	Stefan Grünfeld (4th team)
—	GK	SUI	Ernst Zorzotti
—	DF	SUI	Armando Ardizzoia
—	DF	FRG	Hermann Enderlin (II)
—	DF	SUI	Alfred Heidig
—	MF	SUI	Ernst Hufschmid
—	DF	SUI	Peter Riesterer
—	DF	SUI	Ernst Weber
—	MF	SUI	Max Galler (II)
—	MF	SUI	Otto Meier

No.	Pos.	Nation	Player
—	MF	SUI	Walter Notz
—	MF	SUI	Emil Riedener
—	MF	SUI	Paul Schaub
—	FW	SUI	Karl Bielser
—	FW	FRG	Alfred Enderlin (I)
—	FW	SUI	Alfred Jaeck
—	FW	SUI	Leopold Kielholz
—	FW	SUI	Walter Müller
—	FW	SUI	Alfred Schlecht
—	FW	SUI	Max Strasser
—	FW	POL	Leopold Wionsowsky

Players who left the squad

Note: Flags indicate national team as defined under FIFA eligibility rules; some limited exceptions apply. Players may hold more than one non-FIFA nationality.

No.	Pos.	Nation	Player
—	GK	SUI	Traugott Märki
—	DF	SUI	Hugo Flubacher
—	MF	SUI	Georg Heimann

No.	Pos.	Nation	Player
—	FW	SUI	Max Oswald
—	FW	SUI	Karl Wüthrich
—	FW	SUI	Eugen Schmid

== Results ==
=== Legend ===
Win Draw Loss Postponed

=== Friendly matches ===
==== Pre- and mid-season ====
11 August 1929 Pre-season	FV Lörrach (West Germany)	3–8	(Switzerland) Basel	Lörrach
	Goal	Summary	Goal

18 August 1929 Pre-season	Yverdon-Sports (Switzerland)	1–4	(Switzerland) Basel	Yverdon
	Goal	Summary	Goal

18 August 1929 Pre-season	Servette (Switzerland)	1–5	(Switzerland) Basel	Yverdon
	Goal	Summary	Goal

22 September 1929 Pre-season	AS Strasbourg (France)	1–3	(Switzerland) Basel	Strasbourg
	(1:2)	Summary	(0:1) (0:2) (1:3)	Attendance: 3,000

6 October 1929 Mid-season	Biel-Bienne (Switzerland)	3–2	(Switzerland) Basel	Gurzelen Stadion, Biel/Bienne
	Bonny (1:1); Aeschbacher (2:1); Aeschbacher (3:2)	Summary	(0:1) Enderlin (I) (2:2) Schlecht	Attendance: 600

27 October 1929 Mid-season	Servette (Switzerland)	3–3	(Switzerland) Basel	Geneva
	(1:2) (2:3) (3:3)	Summary	(0:1) (0:2) (1:3)	Attendance: 1,000; Referee: (Switzerland) Kim Geneva

==== Winter break to end of season ====
1 January 1930 Winter break	Young Fellows Zürich (Switzerland)	3–6	(Switzerland) Basel	Förrlibuck, Zürich
	Winkler (IV) 10' (1:0); Diebold (2:0); Diebold 65' (3:6)	Summary	23' (2:1) Enderlin (I); 27' (2:2) Enderlin (I); 40' (2:3) Enderlin (I); 50' (2:4) Wionsowsky; 61' (2:5) Schaub; 62' (2:6) Wionsowsky	Attendance: 1,500

19 January 1930 Winter break	La Chaux-de-Fonds (Switzerland)	1–7	(Switzerland) Basel	Parc des Sports, La Chaux-de-Fonds
14:30	Goal	Summary	Goal

12 April 1930 Mid-season	Basel (Switzerland)	1–0	(Hungary) 33 FC Budai	Landhof, Basel
16:30	Schlecht 51' (1:0)	Summary		Attendance: 3,000; Referee: (Switzerland) Allemann Biel/Bienne

1 May 1930 Mid-season	Basel (Switzerland)	3–4	(France) Mulhouse	Landhof, Basel
15:00	(o.g. 1:1); Schlecht 60' (2:1); Kielholz 65' (3:2)	Summary	12' (0:1); 63' (2:2); Korb (3:3); Lieb 88' (3:4)	Attendance: 2,500; Referee: (Switzerland) Feurer Delémont

3 May 1930 Mid-season	Basel (Switzerland)	v	(Switzerland) Nordstern Basel	Landhof, Basel
		[ Summary]

3 June 1930 End of season	VfB Leipzig (West Germany)	2–4	(Switzerland) Basel	Sportpark Connewitz Leipzig
18:45	Bödecker 15' (1:0); Schrepper 85' (2:4)	Summary	(1:1) Müller (1:2) Schlecht (1:3) Jaeck (1:4) Schlecht

5 June 1930 End of season	Mjøndalen IF/SBK Drafn (Norway)	1–2	(Switzerland) Basel	Drammen
1930	(1:2)	Summary	30' (0:1) Bielser; 40' (0:2) Jaeck

8 June 1930 End of season	Odds BK (Norway)	1–2	(Switzerland) Basel	Porsgrunn
	Mitchel (1:1)	Summary	(0:1) Schlecht (1:2) Bielser	Attendance: 2,000

9 June 1930 End of season	Urædd FK (Norway)	6–3	(Switzerland) Basel	Porsgrunn
15:00	5' (1:0); 10' (2:0); 15' (3:0); 20' (4:0) (5:2); 89' (6:3)	Summary	40' (4:1) Enderlin (I) (4:2) Müller; 85' (5:3)

12 June 1930 End of season	SK Brann (Norway)	2–3	(Switzerland) Basel	Bergen
	55' (1:3); 60' (2:3)	Summary	25' (0:1) Galler (0:2) Bielser; 50' (0:3) Jaeck	Attendance: 3,000

15 June 1930 End of season	Viking FK (Norway)	2–2	(Switzerland) Basel	Stavanger
	30' (1:1); 65' (2:2)	Summary	23' (0:1) Jaeck; 48' (1:2) Bielser

17 June 1930 End of season	Viking FK (Norway)	3–1	(Switzerland) Basel	Stavanger
	(1:1) (2:1) (3:1)	Summary	(0:1) Kielholz	Attendance: 2,000

=== Serie A ===
==== Central Group results ====
1 September 1929 Round 1	FC Bern	1–4	Basel	Neufeld, Bern
	Molteni 30' (1:2)	Summary	3' (0:1) Enderlin (I); 5' (0:2) Meier (1:3) Bielser (1:4) Enderlin (I)	Attendance: 800; Referee: (Switzerland) Chaladon Geneva

8 September 1929 Round 2	Basel	4–1	Grenchen	Landhof, Basel
15:45	Schaub 5' (1:0); Bielser 6' (2:0); Müller 60' (3:0); Müller 62' (4:0)	Summary	86' (4:1) Klay/Schüpbach	Attendance: 2,000; Referee: (Switzerland) Allemann Biel/Bienne

20 October 1929 Round 3	Basel	1–0	Old Boys	Landhof, Basel
15:00	Schlecht 63' (1:0)	Summary		Attendance: 2,500; Referee: (Switzerland) Chaladon Geneva

10 November 1929 Round 4	Solothurn	1–5	Basel	Stadion FC Solothurn, Solothurn
	(1:3)	Summary	(pen. 0:1) Schlecht (0:2) Schlecht (0:3) Schlecht (1:4) Schlecht (1:5) Müller	Attendance: 1,500; Referee: (Switzerland)

17 November 1929 Round 5	Basel	3–0	Aarau	Landhof, Basel
14:30	Müller 36' (1:0); Enderlin (I) 65' (2:0); Schlecht 85' (3:0)	Summary		Attendance: 3,500; Referee: (Switzerland) Enderli Winterthur

8 December 1929 Round 6	Basel	2–3	Young Boys	Landhof, Basel
14:30	Enderlin (I) 39' (1:1); Enderlin (I) (pen. 2:3)	Summary	37' (pen. 0:1) Dasen; 62' (1:2) Volery (1:3) Schicker	Attendance: 7.000; Referee: (Switzerland) Enderli Winterthur

15 December 1929 Round 7	Basel	3–1	Concordia Basel	Landhof, Basel
14:30	Müller 5' (1:0); Bielser 45' (2:0); Bielser 61' (3:0)	Summary	86' (3:1) Laube	Attendance: 3,000; Referee: (Switzerland) Meyer Lausanne

22 December 1929 Round 8	Nordstern Basel	1–1	Basel	Stadion Rankhof, Basel
14:30	Breitenstein 24' (1:0)	Summary	35' (1:1) Müller	Attendance: 3,000; Referee: (Switzerland) Enderli Winterthur

2 February 1930 Round 9	Basel	4–1	Solothurn	Landhof, Basel
14:30	Bielser 48' (1:0); Schlecht 49' (2:0); Bielser 65' (3:0); Bielser 75' (4:0)	Summary	(pen. 4:1) Dreier	Attendance: 3,000; Referee: (Switzerland) Chaladon Geneva

16 February 1930 Round 10	Basel	9–2	FC Bern	Landhof, Basel
16:00	Bielser 11' (1:0); Enderlin (I) 19' (2:0); Müller 25' (3:0); Wionsowsky 33' (4:0); Enderlin (I) 65' (5:1); Enderlin (I) 68' (6:1); Enderlin (I) 80' (7:1); Bielser (8:2); Müller (9:2)	Summary	(4:1) Berthoud; 81' (7:2) Manz	Attendance: 3,000; Referee: (Switzerland) Bitterli Baden

2 March 1930 Round 11	Old Boys	1–1	Basel	Stadion Schützenmatte, Basel
15:00	Bossi 6' (1:0)	Summary	22' (1:1) Schlecht	Attendance: 4,500; Referee: (Switzerland) Kempf

9 March 1930 Round 12	Basel	1–3	Nordstern Basel	Landhof, Basel
15:00	Bielser 35' (1:1)	Summary	10' (0:1) Bucco; 51' (1:2) Heine; 54' (1:3) Bucco	Attendance: 6,000; Referee: (Switzerland) Enderli Winterthur

16 March 1930 Round 13	Young Boys	2–3	Basel	Wankdorf Stadium, Bern
	Jung 50' (1:2); Dasen 75' (pen. 2:2)	Summary	16' (0:1) Bielser; 17' (0:2) Müller; 87' (2:3) Schlecht	Attendance: 5,000; Referee: (Switzerland) Allemann Biel/Bienne

30 March 1930 Round 14	Grenchen	0–0	Basel	Stadion Brühl, Grenchen
		Summary		Attendance: 2,000; Referee: (Switzerland) Mercet Locarno

6 April 1930 Round 15	Concordia Basel	2–4	Basel	Landhof, Basel
15:00	Rau 30' (1:2); Christen 70' (2:2)	Summary	3' (0:1) Enderlin (I); 12' (pen. 0:2) Enderlin (I); 80' (2:3) Bielser; 90' (2:4) Schlecht	Attendance: 4,000; Referee: (Switzerland) Allemann Biel/Bienne

27 April 1930 Round 16	Aarau	1–1	Basel	Stadion Brügglifeld, Aarau
	Lüthy (I) (1:0)	Summary	28' (1:1) Strasser	Attendance: 1,200; Referee: (Switzerland) Bitterli Baden

==== Central Group table ====
Pos	Team	Pld	W	D	L	GF	GA	GD	Pts	Qualification
1	Basel	16	10	4	2	46	20	+26	24	Group winners / advance to finals
2	Young Boys	16	10	2	4	51	18	+33	22	Advance to finals
3	Grenchen	16	8	3	5	24	19	+5	19	
4	Aarau	16	5	5	6	28	27	+1	15	
5	FC Bern	16	5	5	6	24	30	−6	15	
6	Old Boys	16	5	4	7	22	21	+1	14	
7	Concordia Basel	16	4	5	7	18	29	−11	13	
8	Nordstern Basel	16	4	4	8	22	36	−14	12	
9	Solothurn	16	4	2	10	21	56	−35	10	

Source: rsssf.com

==== Final Group results ====
11 May 1930 Round 1	Lugano	4–1	Basel	Campo Marzio, Lugano
	Poretti 24' (1:0); Fink 25' (2:0); Costa 35' (3:0); Fink 79' (4:0)	Summary	81' (4:1) Schlecht	Attendance: 3,000; Referee: (Switzerland) Pachoud Bern

18 May 1930 Round 2	Basel	1–0	Biel-Bienne	Landhof, Basel
15:00	Schlecht 24' (1:0)	Summary		Attendance: 5,500; Referee: (Switzerland) Demartines Lausanne

25 May 1930 Round 3	Grasshopper Club	1–0	Basel	Hardturm, Zürich
15:00	Weiler 35' (1:0)	Summary		Attendance: 8,000; Referee: (Switzerland) Dagon Solothurn

1 June 1930 Round 4	Basel	0–3	Servette	Landhof, Basel
15:00		Summary	45' (0:1) Pasello; 51' (0:2) Chabanel; 56' (pen. 0:3) Link	Attendance: 4,500; Referee: (Switzerland) Enderli Winterthur

==== Final Group table ====
Pos	Team	Pld	W	D	L	GF	GA	GD	Pts	Qualification
1	Servette	4	4	0	0	11	3	+8	8	Swiss champions
2	Grasshopper Club	4	2	1	1	7	5	+2	5	
3	Biel-Bienne	4	2	1	1	5	4	+1	5	
4	Lugano	4	1	0	3	6	7	−1	2	
4	Young Boys	4	1	0	3	5	9	−4	2	
4	Basel	4	1	0	3	2	8	−6	2	

Source: rsssf.com

=== Swiss Cup ===
15 August 1929 Preliminary round	Basel	6–2	FC Diana Zürich	Landhof, Basel
10:30	Bielser 25' (1:0); Enderlin (I) 35' (2:0); Müller (3:0); Müller (4:0); Wionsowsky (5:2); Enderlin (I) (6:2)	FCB summary	(4:1) (4:2)	Attendance: 1,000; Referee: (Switzerland) Bitterli (Baden)
Note: FC Diana Zürich played the 1929/30 season in the Serie B (third-tier).

13 October 1929 First round	Basel	10–0	FC Dietikon	Landhof, Basel
10:45	Enderlin (I) 7' (1:0); Bielser 10' (2:0); Bielser 16' (3:0); Bielser 19' (4:0); Wionsowsky 34' (5:0); Galler (6:0); Strasser 55' (7:0); Müller 60' (8:0); Bielser 61' (9:0); Bielser 75' (10:0)	FCB summary		Attendance: 1,800; Referee: (Switzerland) Krämer (Basel)
Note: FC Dietikon played the 1929/30 season in the Serie B (third-tier).

3 November 1929 Second round	Lugano	3–5	Basel	Campo Marzio, Lugano
	Fink 39' (1:1); Fink 81' (2:3); Sturzenegger 80' (3:4)	FCB summary	31' (0:1) Müller; 41' (1:2) Schlecht; 54' (1:3) Bielser; 79' (2:4) Wionsowsky; 85' (3:5) Enderlin (I)	Attendance: 2,500; Referee: (Switzerland) Paschoud (Bern)
Note: Both teams played the 1929/30 season in the Serie A (top-tier).

1 December 1929 Third round	Locarno	5–4	Basel	Campo Sportivo Alle Palestre, Locarno
14:45	(1:0); Case (II) (2:3); Case (II) (3:3); Mutter 70' (4:3); Mutter 75' (5:3)	FCB summary	(1:1) Enderlin (I) (1:2) Schlecht (1:3) Schlecht; 88' (5:4) Wionsowsky	Attendance: 1,000; Referee: (Switzerland) Ferdinand Allemann (Biel/Bienne)
Note: Locarno played the 1929/30 season in the Serie Promotion (second-tier) and at the end of the seasons became second-tier champions.

== See also ==
- History of FC Basel
- List of FC Basel players
- List of FC Basel seasons

== Sources ==
- Rotblau: Jahrbuch Saison 2014/2015. Publisher: FC Basel Marketing AG. ISBN 978-3-7245-2027-6
- Die ersten 125 Jahre. Publisher: Josef Zindel im Friedrich Reinhardt Verlag, Basel. ISBN 978-3-7245-2305-5
- FCB team 1929–30 at fcb-archiv.ch
- Switzerland 1929-30 at RSSSF
