= Otto Meier =

Swiss footballer

Personal information
- Full name: Otto Meier
- Place of birth: Switzerland
- Date of death: 1967
- Position: Midfielder

Senior career*
| Years | Team | Apps | (Gls) |
| 1926–1931 | FC Basel | 52 | (2) |
- * Club domestic league appearances and goals

Otto Meier (date of birth unknown; died 1967) was a Swiss footballer who played for FC Basel in the late 1920's. He played in the position of midfielder.

== Football career ==
Meier joined Basel's first team in 1926, but during his first season he only played in one friendly match. He played his domestic league debut for the club in the home match at the Landhof on 9 October 1927 as Basel won 1–0 against Nordstern Basel. He scored his first goal for his club during the 1928–29 Serie A season on 23 December 1928 in the away game against FC Bern as Basel won 5–3.

A well-documented curiosity was that at the end of Basel's 1929–30 season, the team set off on a Scandinavian football tour, including a visit to Germany. Six games were played in Norway, but the first was played in Leipzig. The team travelled with 15 players, their trainer Kertész and two functionaries. The journey started with a train ride on 2 June 1930 at quarter past seven in the morning from Basel and they arrived in Leipzig at half passed eight that evening. The game against VfB Leipzig was played the next evening. The following one and a half days were spent travelling by train, train, ship, train and train again to Drammen in Norway. Only a few hours after their arrival, the team played a game against a joint team Mjøndalen IF / SBK Drafn. The next day was a train journey to Porsgrunn and two matches in 24 hours. Following that they travelled per bus and then by ship in a 48-hour journey to Bergen for a match against SK Brann. Another ship voyage, this time to Stavanger, two games against Viking FK, then a ship voyage back to Bergen. Finally, the tour ended with three train journeys in three days, Bergen/Oslo/Berlin/Basel, arriving at home on 20 June. The result of this tour was seven games, four wins, one draw, two defeats and approximately 160 hours of travelling. Meier was member of this tour. He played in six of the games.

Between the years 1926 and 1931 Meier played a total of 87 games for Basel scoring a total of two goals. 52 of these games were in the Swiss Serie A, nine in the Swiss Cup and 26 were friendly games. He scored both his goals in the domestic league.

== Sources ==
- Rotblau: Jahrbuch Saison 2017/2018. Publisher: FC Basel Marketing AG. ISBN 978-3-7245-2189-1
- Die ersten 125 Jahre. Publisher: Josef Zindel im Friedrich Reinhardt Verlag, Basel. ISBN 978-3-7245-2305-5
- Verein "Basler Fussballarchiv" Homepage
