= Hans Nikles =

Swiss footballer

Personal information
- Full name: Hans Nikles
- Place of birth: Switzerland
- Position: Goalkeeper

Senior career*
Years	Team	Apps	(Gls)
1930–1931	FC Basel	17	(0)
- * Club domestic league appearances and goals

Hans Nikles was a Swiss footballer who played one season for FC Basel. He played as goalkeeper.

Nikes joined Basel's first team in for their 1930–31 season. He played his domestic league debut for the club in the away game on 14 September 1930 as Basel won 3–0 against Young Boys.

In that season Nikes played a total of 23 games for Basel. 17 of these games were in the Swiss Serie A, one in the Swiss Cup and five were friendly games. He held a clean sheet in four of his 17 domestic league games.

== Sources ==
- Rotblau: Jahrbuch Saison 2017/2018. Publisher: FC Basel Marketing AG. ISBN 978-3-7245-2189-1
- Die ersten 125 Jahre. Publisher: Josef Zindel im Friedrich Reinhardt Verlag, Basel. ISBN 978-3-7245-2305-5
- Verein "Basler Fussballarchiv" Homepage
