= 1917–18 Swiss Serie A =

Swiss football season

Swiss Serie A
- Season: 1917–18

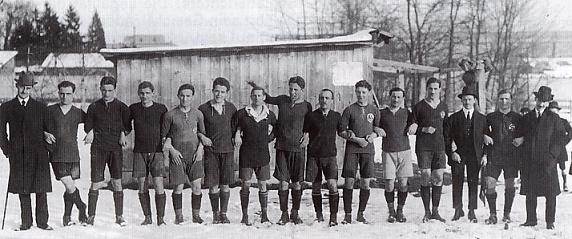
Championship team of Servette Football Club 1918

Statistics of Swiss Super League in the 1917–18 season.

== East ==
=== Table ===
Pos	Team	Pld	W	D	L	GF	GA	GD	Pts
1	FC St. Gallen	14	10	2	2	37	21	+16	22
2	FC Zürich	14	9	2	3	37	27	+10	20
3	Brühl St. Gallen	14	8	2	4	35	22	+13	18
4	Neumünster Zürich	14	5	2	7	31	26	+5	12
5	FC Winterthur	14	6	0	8	30	32	−2	12
6	Grasshopper Club Zürich	14	5	1	8	24	35	−11	11
7	Blue Stars Zürich	14	4	1	9	24	34	−10	9
8	Young Fellows Zürich	14	4	0	10	22	43	−21	8

Source: rsssf.com

== Central ==
=== Table ===
Pos	Team	Pld	W	D	L	GF	GA	GD	Pts
1	Young Boys Bern	12	8	3	1	52	18	+34	19
2	FC Basel	12	7	3	2	31	19	+12	17
3	FC Aarau	12	7	2	3	24	16	+8	16
4	FC Bern	12	4	4	4	21	26	−5	12
5	Nordstern Basel	12	3	2	7	18	26	−8	8
6	FC Biel	12	4	0	8	24	36	−12	8
7	Old Boys Basel	12	2	0	10	21	50	−29	4

Source: rsssf.com

== West ==
=== Table ===
Pos	Team	Pld	W	D	L	GF	GA	GD	Pts
1	Servette Genf	14	12	1	1	74	21	+53	25
2	Etoile La Chaux-de-Fonds	14	9	3	2	46	20	+26	21
3	FC La Chaux-de-Fonds	14	9	3	2	42	26	+16	21
4	Cantonal Neuchatel	14	6	1	7	35	43	−8	13
5	Lausanne Sports	14	5	3	6	28	36	−8	13
6	FC Genf	14	3	5	6	32	44	−12	11
7	Stella Fribourg	14	3	1	10	19	45	−26	7
8	Montreux Sports	14	0	1	13	10	51	−41	1

Source: rsssf.com

== Final ==
=== Table ===
Pos	Team	Pld	W	D	L	GF	GA	GD	Pts
1	Servette Genf	2	2	0	0	8	2	+6	4
2	Young Boys Bern	2	1	0	1	4	5	−1	2
3	FC St. Gallen	2	0	0	2	1	6	−5	0

Source: rsssf.com

=== Results ===
Team 1	Score	Team 2
17 March 1918
Servette	4–2	Young Boys
14 April 1918
Young Boys	2–1	St. Gallen
5 May 1918
Servette	4–0	St. Gallen

Servette Genf won the championship.

== Sources ==
- Switzerland 1917-18 at RSSSF
