= Emil Riedener =

Swiss footballer

Personal information
- Full name: Emil Riedener
- Place of birth: Switzerland
- Position: Midfielder

Senior career*
Years	Team	Apps	(Gls)
1929–1931	FC Basel	5	(0)
- * Club domestic league appearances and goals

Emil Riedener was a Swiss footballer who played for FC Basel. He played as midfielder.

Riedener joined Basel's first team in 1929. He played his first game for the club in the Swiss Cup match away from home on 1 December 1929 as Basel were eliminated from the competition 4–5 against Locarno. He played his domestic league debut for the club in the home game at the Landhof on 2 February as Basel won 4–1 against Solothurn.

A well-documented curiosity was that at the end of Basel's 1929–30 season, the team set off on a Scandinavian football tour, including a visit to Germany. Six games were played in Norway, but the first was played in Leipzig. The team travelled with 15 players, their trainer Kertész and two functionaries. The journey started with a train ride on 2 June 1930 at quarter past seven in the morning from Basel and they arrived in Leipzig at half passed eight that evening. The game against VfB Leipzig was played the next evening. The following one and a half days were spent travelling by train, train, ship, train and train again to Drammen in Norway. Only a few hours after their arrival, the team played a game against a joint team Mjøndalen IF / SBK Drafn. The next day was a train journey to Porsgrunn and two matches in 24 hours. Following that they travelled per bus and then by ship in a 48-hour journey to Bergen for a match against SK Brann. Another ship voyage, this time to Stavanger, two games against Viking FK, then a ship voyage back to Bergen. Finally, the tour ended with three train journeys in three days, Bergen/Oslo/Berlin/Basel, arriving at home on 20 June. The result of this tour was seven games, four wins, one draw, two defeats and approximately 160 hours of travelling. Riedener was member of the tour, but played in only three of these games.

In the two seasons that he played for the team Riedener played a total of 7 games for Basel without scoring a goal. 5 of these games were in the Swiss Serie A and 1 Liga, one in the Swiss Cup and one was a friendly games.

== Sources ==
- Rotblau: Jahrbuch Saison 2017/2018. Publisher: FC Basel Marketing AG. ISBN 978-3-7245-2189-1
- Die ersten 125 Jahre. Publisher: Josef Zindel im Friedrich Reinhardt Verlag, Basel. ISBN 978-3-7245-2305-5
- Verein "Basler Fussballarchiv" Homepage
