= Armando Ardizzoia =

Swiss footballer (1907-1968)

Personal information
- Full name: Armando Ardizzoia
- Date of birth: 1907
- Place of birth: Switzerland
- Date of death: 20 October 1968 (aged 60–61)
- Position: Defender

Senior career*
Years	Team	Apps	(Gls)
1925–1933	FC Basel	60	(1)
- * Club domestic league appearances and goals

Armando Ardizzoia (1907 - 20 October 1968) was a Swiss footballer who played for FC Basel. He played mainly in the position of defender.

Between the years 1925 and 1933 Ardizzoia played a total of 87 games for Basel scoring a total of 2 goals. 60 of these games were in the Swiss Serie A, six in the Swiss Cup and 21 were friendly games. He scored one single goal in the domestic league. This was on 20 March 1927 as Basel beat FC Bern 6–2. The other goal was scored during the test game against Biel-Bienne on 5 May 1929. Basel came from being 0–4 behind at half time and Ardizoia scored the equaliser in the 70th minute for a 4–4 result.

A well-documented curiosity was that at the end of Basel's 1929–30 season, the team set off on a Scandinavian football tour, including a visit to Germany. Six games were played in Norway, but the first was played in Leipzig. The team travelled with 15 players, their trainer Kertész and two functionaries. The journey started with a train ride on 2 June 1930 at quarter past seven in the morning from Basel and they arrived in Leipzig at half past eight that evening. The game against VfB Leipzig was played the next evening. The following one and a half days were spent travelling by train, train, ship, train and train again to Drammen in Norway. Only a few hours after their arrival, the team played a game against a joint team Mjøndalen IF / SBK Drafn. The next day was a train journey to Porsgrunn and two matches in 24 hours. Following that they travelled per bus and then by ship on a 48-hour journey to Bergen for a match against SK Brann. Another ship voyage, this time to Stavanger, two games against Viking FK, then a ship voyage back to Bergen. Finally, the tour ended with three train journeys in three days, Bergen/Oslo/Berlin/Basel, arriving at home on 20 June. This tour resulted in seven games, four wins, one draw, two defeats and approximately 160 hours of travelling. Ardizzoia was participant in this tour and he played in 5 of these games.

Ardizzoia was a member of the Basel squad that won the Swiss Cup in the 1932–33 season. The final was played in the Hardturm stadium against Grasshopper Club. Basel won 4–3 and this was the club's first ever national title. Ardizzoia did not play in that game and ended his football playing time at the end of that season.

== Sources ==
- Rotblau: Jahrbuch Saison 2017/2018. Publisher: FC Basel Marketing AG. ISBN 978-3-7245-2189-1
- Die ersten 125 Jahre. Publisher: Josef Zindel im Friedrich Reinhardt Verlag, Basel. ISBN 978-3-7245-2305-5
- Verein "Basler Fussballarchiv" Homepage
