= Walter Notz =

Swiss footballer

Personal information
- Full name: Walter Notz
- Place of birth: Switzerland
- Position: Midfielder

Senior career*
Years	Team	Apps	(Gls)
1929–1931	FC Basel	6	(1)
- * Club domestic league appearances and goals

Walter Notz was a Swiss footballer who played for FC Basel. He played as midfielder.

Notz joined FC Basel's first team in 1929. He played his domestic league debut for the club in the away game on 1 September 1929 as Basel won 4–1 against FC Bern. He scored his first goal for his club during the 1930–31 season on 12 April 1931 in the away game against Solothurn. It was the first goal of the game but it didn't stop the defeat as Basel lost 2–4.

In the two seasons in the team Notz played a total of eight games for Basel scoring one goal. Six of these games were in the Swiss Serie A and two were friendly games.

== Sources ==
- Rotblau: Jahrbuch Saison 2017/2018. Publisher: FC Basel Marketing AG. ISBN 978-3-7245-2189-1
- Die ersten 125 Jahre. Publisher: Josef Zindel im Friedrich Reinhardt Verlag, Basel. ISBN 978-3-7245-2305-5
- Verein "Basler Fussballarchiv" Homepage
