= Edmond De Weck =

Swiss footballer (1901-1977)

Personal information
- Date of birth: 28 April 1901
- Date of death: 19 March 1977 (aged 75)

International career
| Years | Team | Apps | (Gls) |
| 1923-1927 | Switzerland | 9 | (0) |

Edmond De Weck (28 April 1901 – 19 March 1977) was a Swiss footballer. He played in nine matches for the Switzerland national football team between 1923 and 1927.
