= 1929–30 Swiss Serie A =

33rd season of top-tier Swiss football

Swiss Serie A
- Season: 1929–30

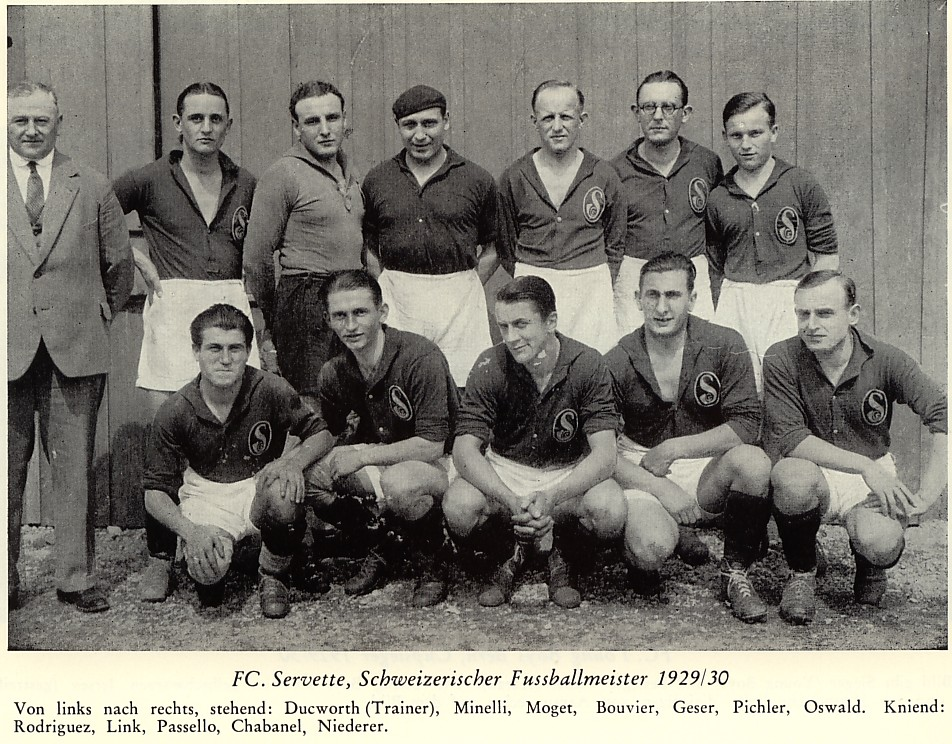
Swiss Champion 1929/30 Servette FC From left to right, standing: Ducworth (Trainer), Minelli, Moget, Bouvier, Geser, Pichler, Oswald Kneeling: Rodriguez, Link, Passello, Chabanel, Niederer

Statistics of Swiss Super League in the 1929–30 season.

== East ==
=== Table ===
Pos	Team	Pld	W	D	L	GF	GA	GD	Pts
1	Grasshopper Club Zürich	16	13	3	0	55	13	+42	29
2	FC Lugano	16	10	3	3	48	25	+23	23
3	FC Zürich	16	9	3	4	48	33	+15	21
4	Young Fellows Zürich	16	8	2	6	43	39	+4	18
5	Brühl St. Gallen	16	8	0	8	29	35	−6	16
6	Blue Stars Zürich	16	4	3	9	27	37	−10	11
7	FC Winterthur	16	4	2	10	20	35	−15	10
8	FC Chiasso	16	4	1	11	24	52	−28	9
9	FC St. Gallen	16	2	3	11	25	50	−25	7

Source: rsssf.com

=== Results ===
Home \ Away	BSZ	BRÜ	CHI	GCZ	LUG	STG	WIN	YFZ	ZÜR
Blue Stars Zürich		2–3	1–1	0–0	2–6	5–2	3–2	0–2	3–4
Brühl	3–1		5–2	0–6	1–3	2–0	3–1	4–0	0–3
Chiasso	1–0	1–2		1–3	1–2	3–2	2–3	3–5	1–3
Grasshopper	4–0	6–0	8–0		1–1	3–0	1–0	3–3	3–1
Lugano	3–1	1–0	7–0	1–3		5–1	5–1	4–3	4–2
St. Gallen	2–2	2–0	0–1	2–4	1–3		3–2	3–3	2–2
Winterthur	1–0	1–0	0–5	1–2	1–1	3–1		0–2	1–3
Young Fellows	1–3	5–3	4–1	1–3	3–1	4–2	3–2		1–3
Zürich	2–4	2–1	6–1	2–4	2–2	8–2	1–1	4–3	

Legend: Blue = home team win; Yellow = draw; Red = away team win.

== Central ==
=== Table ===
Pos	Team	Pld	W	D	L	GF	GA	GD	Pts
1	FC Basel	16	10	4	2	46	20	+26	24
2	BSC Young Boys	16	10	2	4	51	18	+33	22
3	FC Grenchen	16	8	3	5	24	19	+5	19
4	FC Aarau	16	5	5	6	28	27	+1	15
4	FC Bern	16	5	5	6	24	30	−6	15
6	BSC Old Boys Basel	16	5	4	7	22	21	+1	14
7	FC Concordia Basel	16	4	5	7	18	29	−11	13
8	Nordstern Basel	16	4	4	8	22	36	−14	12
9	FC Solothurn	16	4	2	10	21	56	−35	10

Source: rsssf.com

=== Results ===
Home \ Away	AAR	BAS	BER	CON	GRE	NOR	OBB	SOL	YB
Aarau		1–1	0–0	7–2	3–0	4–1	1–4	2–1	0–0
Basel	3–0		9–2	3–1	4–1	1–3	1–0	4–1	2–3
Bern	2–0	1–4		0–0	1–1	3–0	1–1	2–0	0–1
Concordia	0–0	2–4	2–2		2–1	2–0	1–2	0–1	0–2
Grenchen	4–1	0–0	2–1	0–0		1–0	1–0	6–2	0–1
Nordstern	2–1	1–1	4–0	4–0	4–1		1–1	3–5	1–4
Old Boys	1–3	1–1	3–1	2–4	0–1	0–0		5–0	0–3
Solothurn	2–1	1–5	2–3	1–1	0–3	1–1	2–1		0–6
Young Boys	4–4	2–3	5–1	0–1	0–2	8–1	0–1	13–2	

Legend: Blue = home team win; Yellow = draw; Red = away team win.

== West ==
=== Table ===
Pos	Team	Pld	W	D	L	GF	GA	GD	Pts
1	FC Biel Bienne	16	12	2	2	42	19	+23	26
2	Servette Genf	16	11	0	5	55	21	+34	22
3	Urania Genève Sports	16	9	3	4	35	17	+18	21
4	Etoile Carouge	16	6	4	6	35	37	−2	16
5	Lausanne Sports	16	6	2	8	24	27	−3	14
5	Etoile La Chaux-de-Fonds	16	6	2	8	25	47	−22	14
7	FC La Chaux-de-Fonds	16	6	1	9	39	37	+2	13
8	FC Fribourg	16	3	3	10	37	51	−14	9
8	Cantonal Neuchâtel	16	2	5	9	18	54	−36	9

Source: rsssf.com

=== Results ===
Home \ Away	BIE	CAN	CDF	ÉTC	ÉTS	FRI	LS	SER	UGS
Biel		6–0	2–3	0–0	3–2	4–2	2–0	2–1	2–1
Cantonal Neuchâtel	2–5		2–1	2–3	0–0	2–0	1–1	1–2	1–8
Chaux-de-Fonds	1–2	5–0		8–2	1–2	5–4	6–2	1–3	1–0
Étoile Carouge	2–4	2–2	1–0		2–3	3–1	1–2	3–1	1–2
Étoile-Sporting	1–4	1–1	2–1	1–6		3–1	1–0	0–2	0–4
Fribourg	1–2	2–2	4–4	3–3	6–3		2–1	2–5	2–0
Lausanne-Sports	0–2	7–1	2–1	3–2	1–3	3–1		1–3	0–0
Servette	2–1	8–0	6–0	5–1	10–2	6–3	0–1		0–1
Urania	1–1	3–1	3–1	1–1	4–1	4–3	1–0	2–1	

Legend: Blue = home team win; Yellow = draw; Red = away team win.

== Final ==
=== Table ===
Pos	Team	Pld	W	D	L	GF	GA	GD	Pts
1	Servette Genf	4	4	0	0	11	3	+8	8
2	Grasshopper Club Zürich	4	2	1	1	7	5	+2	5
2	FC Biel Bienne	4	2	1	1	5	4	+1	5
4	FC Lugano	4	1	0	3	6	7	−1	2
4	BSC Young Boys	4	1	0	3	5	9	−4	2
4	FC Basel	4	1	0	3	2	8	−6	2

Source: rsssf.com

=== Results ===
Team 1	Score	Team 2
11 May 1930
Bienne	3–3	Grasshopper
Lugano	4–1	Basel
Servette	4–2	Young Boys
18 May 1930
Basel	1–0	Bienne
Servette	1–0	Grasshopper
Young Boys	2–1	Lugano
25 May 1930
Grasshopper	1–0	Basel
Lugano	1–3	Servette
Young Boys	0–1	Bienne
1 June 1930
Bienne	1–0	Lugano
Basel	0–3	Servette
Grasshopper	3–1	Young Boys

Servette Genf won the championship.

== Sources ==
- Switzerland 1929-30 at RSSSF
