= Ernst Christ =

Swiss footballer

Personal information
- Full name: Ernst Christ
- Place of birth: Switzerland
- Position: Goalkeeper

Senior career*
Years	Team	Apps	(Gls)
1926–1928	FC Basel	12	(0)
1928–	FC Solothurn		
- * Club domestic league appearances and goals

Ernst Christ was a Swiss footballer who played for FC Basel and Solothurn as goalkeeper.

Christ joined the Basel first team in 1926, but during his first season he only played in one friendly match. He played his domestic league debut for the club in the home match at the Landhof on 30 October 1927 as Basel lost 0–5 against Young Boys. He played his first shut-out 4 December 1927 in the away match against Nordstern Basel as Basel won 1–0.

Between the years 1926 and 1928 Christ played a total of 17 games for Basel. 12 of these games were in the Swiss Serie A and the other five were friendly games. Following his two season at Basel Christ moved on to stand between the posts for Solothurn.

== Sources ==
- Rotblau: Jahrbuch Saison 2017/2018. Publisher: FC Basel Marketing AG. ISBN 978-3-7245-2189-1
- Die ersten 125 Jahre. Publisher: Josef Zindel im Friedrich Reinhardt Verlag, Basel. ISBN 978-3-7245-2305-5
- Verein "Basler Fussballarchiv" Homepage
