= Leopold Wionsowsky =

Polish footballer, trainer, and manager

Personal information
- Full name: Leopold Wionsowsky
- Position: Striker

Youth career
- until 1916: Servette

Senior career*
| Years | Team | Apps | (Gls) |
| 1916–1920 | Servette | ? | (?) |
| 1920–1929 | Old Boys | ? | (?) |
| 1929–1932 | Basel | 30 | (7) |

Managerial career
- 1937–1939: Nordstern Basel
- 1942–1943: Servette
- * Club domestic league appearances and goals

Leopold Wionsowsky was a Polish footballer who played as a striker. He played for Servette, Old Boys and FC Basel. He later became a trainer/manager and worked for Nordstern Basel and Servette.

== Football career ==
Wionsowsky played youth football for Servette He played four seasons for their first team from 1916–17 to 1919–1920. In the 1917–18 Swiss Serie A season he won the Swiss championship with his club. He moved on to Old Boys for the 1920–21 season and played there for nine years.

Wionsowsky joined Basel's first team in the 1929–30 season. After playing in two test games he played his team debut in the Swiss Cup match on 25 August 1929 against FC Diana Zürich. Basel won 6–2 and he scored one of the goals. He played his domestic league debut for the club in the home game at the Landhof on 20 October 1929 as Basel won 1–0 against his former club Old Boys. He scored his first league goal for his new club on 16 February 1930 in the home game against FC Bern as Basel won 9–2.

Between the years 1929 and 1932 Wionsowsky played a total of 50 games for Basel scoring a total of 17 goals. 30 of these games were in the Swiss Serie A, seven in the Swiss Cup and 13 were friendly games. He scored seven goal in the domestic league, six in the cup and the other four were scored during the test games.

He later became trainer/manager and worked for Nordstern Basel and Servette.

== Honours ==
Sevette

- Swiss Serie A: 1917–18

== Sources ==
- Rotblau: Jahrbuch Saison 2017/2018. Publisher: FC Basel Marketing AG. ISBN 978-3-7245-2189-1
- Die ersten 125 Jahre. Publisher: Josef Zindel im Friedrich Reinhardt Verlag, Basel. ISBN 978-3-7245-2305-5
- Verein "Basler Fussballarchiv" Homepage
