= Paul Schaub =

Swiss footballer (born 1907)

Personal information
- Full name: Paul Schaub
- Date of birth: 1907
- Place of birth: Switzerland
- Date of death: unknown
- Position: Midfielder

Senior career*
Years	Team	Apps	(Gls)
1926–1937	Basel	179	(9)
1938–1939	Kreuzlingen		

International career
1934	Switzerland	2	(0)
- * Club domestic league appearances and goals

Paul Schaub (born 1907; date of death unknown) was a Swiss footballer who played for FC Basel and FC Kreuzlingen. He also played one game for Swiss national team. He played mainly in the position of midfielder.

== Club career ==
Schaub joined Basel's first team in advance of their 1926–27 season. After playing just one test match, he played his domestic league debut for the club in the home game at the Landhof on 14 May 1927 as Basel won 1–0 against local rivals Concordia Basel. He scored his first goal for his club on 12 May 1929 in the away game against Aarau. In fact Schaub scored two goals in that game, as the two teams played a 2–2 draw.

A well-documented curiosity was that at the end of Basel's 1929–30 season, the team set off on a Scandinavian football tour, including a visit to Germany. Six games were played in Norway, but the first was played in Leipzig. The team travelled with 15 players, their trainer Kertész and two functionaries. The journey started with a train ride on 2 June 1930 at quarter past seven in the morning from Basel and they arrived in Leipzig at half passed eight that evening. The game against VfB Leipzig was played the next evening. The following one and a half days were spent travelling by train, train, ship, train and train again to Drammen in Norway. Only a few hours after their arrival, the team played a game against a joint team Mjøndalen IF / SBK Drafn. The next day was a train journey to Porsgrunn and two matches in 24 hours. Following that they travelled per bus and then by ship in a 48-hour journey to Bergen for a match against SK Brann. Another ship voyage, this time to Stavanger, two games against Viking FK, then a ship voyage back to Bergen. Finally, the tour ended with three train journeys in three days, Bergen/Oslo/Berlin/Basel, arriving at home on 20 June. The result of this tour was seven games, four wins, one draw, two defeats and approximately 160 hours of travelling. Schaub was member of the tour and played in six of these games.

An episode that is noted in association with the Swiss Cup, was the second-round replay away against FC Lugano on 22 November 1931. The mood amongst the 3,000 spectators was heated even before the kick-off. This because after the 3–3 draw in the first game; the local press had circulated the most incredible rumours. Then, Basel's Alfred Schlecht scored the winning goal early, not even two minutes after the game had started. However, shortly before the end of the match referee Hans Wüthrich did not blow his whistle and award a penalty after an alleged handball by a Basel player. The referee ended the game shortly afterwards with a Basel victory and the ill tempers were worsened. After the game there were tumults and riots among the spectators who were not satisfied with the referee's performance. Stones were thrown at referee and players and the windows of the changing rooms were smashed. It was some eight hours before things were settled enough for the police to able to bring both the referee and the entire Basel team to safety, by ship over Lake Lugano. According to the reports in the club chronicles, quite a few players were injured. Josef Remay had a bleeding head, Hermann Enderlin had a hole above his eye, Leopold Kielholz and goalkeeper Paul Blumer were also hurt. Schaub escaped unhurt. Lugano was sanctioned and had to play their next home games at least 100 kilometers from their home ground.

Between the years 1926 and 1937 Schaub played a total of 283 games for Basel, scoring a total of 11 goals. 179 of these games were in the Swiss Serie A/Nationalliga, 26 in the Swiss Cup and 77 were friendly games. He scored 9 goals in the domestic league, the other two were scored during the test games. He was a member of the Basel team that won the Swiss Cup in the 1932–33 season. The final was played in the Hardturm stadium against Grasshopper Club. Basel won 4–3 and achieved the club's first ever national title. He later played one season for Kreuzlingen and then ended his active football career.

Schaub was called up for the Switzerland for the first time in 1932. He played two matches for his country, the first on 14 October 1934 in the Charmilles Stadium, Geneva, against Czechoslovakia as the two teams drew 2–2.

== Honours ==
- Swiss Cup winner: 1932–33

== Sources ==
- Rotblau: Jahrbuch Saison 2017/2018. Publisher: FC Basel Marketing AG. ISBN 978-3-7245-2189-1
- Die ersten 125 Jahre. Publisher: Josef Zindel im Friedrich Reinhardt Verlag, Basel. ISBN 978-3-7245-2305-5
- Verein "Basler Fussballarchiv" Homepage
