= Ernst Weber (footballer) =

Swiss footballer (1902–1991)

Personal information
- Date of birth: 16 December 1902
- Place of birth: Switzerland
- Date of death: 21 February 1991 (aged 88)
- Place of death: Switzerland
- Position: Defender

Senior career*
Years	Team	Apps	(Gls)
1928–1932	FC Basel	20	(0)
- * Club domestic league appearances and goals

Ernst Weber (16 December 1902 – 21 February 1991) was a Swiss footballer who played for FC Basel. He played mainly as defender, but also as midfielder.

Weber joined Basel's first team in summer 1928. After two test games he played his team debut, playing as a midfielder on 2 September 1928 in the Swiss Cup match against FC Baden that Basel won 1–0. He played his domestic league debut for the club in the away game on 21 October 1928 as Basel won 2–1 against Concordia Basel playing as defender. In his last season with the club (1931–32) he only played two games and at the end of the season he retired from active football.

A well-documented curiosity was that at the end of Basel's 1929–30 season, the team set off on a Scandinavian football tour, including a visit to Germany. Six games were played in Norway, but the first was played in Leipzig. The team travelled with 15 players, their trainer Kertész and two functionaries. The journey started with a train ride on 2 June 1930 at quarter past seven in the morning from Basel and they arrived in Leipzig at half-past eight that evening. The game against VfB Leipzig was played the next evening. The following one and a half days were spent travelling by train, train, ship, train and train again to Drammen in Norway. Only a few hours after their arrival, the team played a game against a joint team Mjøndalen IF / SBK Drafn. The next day was a train journey to Porsgrunn and two matches in 24 hours. Following that they travelled per bus and then by ship in a 48-hour journey to Bergen for a match against SK Brann. Another ship voyage, this time to Stavanger, two games against Viking FK, then a ship voyage back to Bergen. Finally, the tour ended with three train journeys in three days, Bergen/Oslo/Berlin/Basel, arriving at home on 20 June. The result of this tour was seven games, four wins, one draw, two defeats and approximately 160 hours of travelling. Weber was participant in this tour and he played in five of these games.

Between the years 1928 and 1932 Weber played a total of 38 games for Basel without scoring a goal. 20 of these games were in the Swiss Serie A, four in the Swiss Cup and 14 were friendly games.

Later Weber was also member of the FC Basel board of directors. Then, following Jules Düblin who in the club's history was the longest and most permanent president, Weber presided the club's board from 1959 until 1962.

== Sources ==
- Rotblau: Jahrbuch Saison 2017/2018. Publisher: FC Basel Marketing AG. ISBN 978-3-7245-2189-1
- Die ersten 125 Jahre. Publisher: Josef Zindel im Friedrich Reinhardt Verlag, Basel. ISBN 978-3-7245-2305-5
- Verein "Basler Fussballarchiv" Homepage
