= Jacques Romberg =

Swiss footballer

Personal information
- Date of birth: 23 September 1905
- Position: Forward

International career
Years	Team	Apps	(Gls)
1928–1930	Switzerland	5	(2)

Jacques Romberg (born 23 September 1905, date of death unknown) was a Swiss footballer. He played in five matches for the Switzerland national football team from 1928 to 1930. He was also part of Switzerland's squad for the football tournament at the 1928 Summer Olympics, but he did not play in any matches.
