= 1928–29 Swiss Serie A =

32nd season of top-tier Swiss football

Swiss Serie A
- Season: 1928–29

Statistics of Swiss Super League in the 1928–29 season.

== East ==
=== Table ===
Pos	Team	Pld	W	D	L	GF	GA	GD	Pts
1	Grasshopper Club Zürich	16	14	1	1	66	24	+42	29
2	FC Lugano	16	10	2	4	46	26	+20	22
3	Blue Stars Zürich	16	10	1	5	33	37	−4	21
4	FC Chiasso	16	7	3	6	29	30	−1	17
5	Brühl St. Gallen	16	6	2	8	32	32	0	14
6	FC Zürich	16	6	2	8	34	38	−4	14
7	Young Fellows Zürich	16	5	4	7	30	39	−9	14
8	FC St. Gallen	16	2	3	11	22	52	−30	7
9	FC Winterthur	16	3	0	13	27	41	−14	6

Source: rsssf.com

=== Results ===
Home \ Away	BSZ	BRÜ	CHI	GCZ	LUG	STG	WIN	YFZ	ZÜR
Blue Stars Zürich		2–1	4–1	1–0	2–4	5–2	5–3	2–1	4–2
Brühl	4–0		3–1	1–3	4–1	4–1	2–1	0–2	1–2
Chiasso	2–1	3–1		2–2	2–0	4–2	3–1	2–3	4–2
Grasshopper	11–0	7–2	3–1		4–2	5–3	4–0	5–4	2–0
Lugano	7–0	0–0	5–1	1–5		3–0	6–1	3–3	5–1
St. Gallen	0–2	2–1	2–2	0–4	1–4		2–1	1–1	0–4
Winterthur	0–2	2–1	0–1	2–3	1–2	7–3		8–2	2–3
Young Fellows	0–0	3–3	1–0	3–4	0–1	2–0	2–1		1–5
Zürich	2–4	2–4	0–0	2–4	1–2	3–3	1–0	4–2	

Legend: Blue = home team win; Yellow = draw; Red = away team win.

== Central ==
=== Table ===
Pos	Team	Pld	W	D	L	GF	GA	GD	Pts
1	Young Boys Bern	16	8	5	3	34	22	+12	21
2	FC Basel	16	8	4	4	48	32	+16	20
3	Nordstern Basel	16	8	2	6	46	32	+14	18
4	FC Bern	16	8	2	6	29	29	0	18
5	FC Concordia Basel	16	8	1	7	33	30	+3	17
6	FC Grenchen	16	6	2	8	20	24	−4	14
7	Old Boys Basel	16	5	3	8	29	32	−3	13
8	FC Solothurn	16	5	2	9	34	49	−15	12
9	FC Aarau	16	4	3	9	26	49	−23	11

Source: rsssf.com

=== Results ===
Home \ Away	AAR	BAS	BER	CON	GRE	NOR	OBB	SOL	YB
Aarau		2–2	3–5	1–0	1–0	4–3	1–1	7–3	0–1
Basel	9–2		3–0	1–4	3–1	1–0	7–3	0–5	2–2
Bern	1–0	3–5		5–0	2–0	1–1	1–0	1–0	2–1
Concordia	3–0	1–1	5–2		0–4	3–0	3–0	1–2	5–2
Grenchen	2–1	0–4	1–2	3–1		3–0	0–0	1–3	0–0
Nordstern	8–1	2–1	2–0	1–4	3–0		3–4	9–3	4–1
Old Boys	6–0	2–2	3–2	1–2	0–1	1–3		4–1	1–2
Solothurn	3–1	2–7	1–1	4–0	1–3	6–4	1–2		2–2
Young Boys	2–2	3–0	4–1	4–0	3–1	1–1	3–1	3–0	

Legend: Blue = home team win; Yellow = draw; Red = away team win.

== West ==
=== Table ===
Pos	Team	Pld	W	D	L	GF	GA	GD	Pts
1	FC Urania Genf	16	13	0	3	50	18	+32	26
2	FC Biel/Bienne	16	10	3	3	53	26	+27	23
3	Etoile Sporting La Chaux-de-Fonds	16	10	3	3	50	27	+23	23
4	FC Servette Genf	16	7	2	7	43	37	+6	16
5	Cantonal Neuchâtel	16	6	3	7	23	36	−13	15
6	Etoile Carouge Genf	16	5	4	7	33	45	−12	14
7	Lausanne Sports	16	5	1	10	46	47	−1	11
8	FC La Chaux-de-Fonds	16	4	3	9	21	36	−15	11
9	FC Fribourg	16	2	1	13	25	72	−47	5

Source: rsssf.com

=== Results ===
Home \ Away	BIE	CAN	CDF	ÉTC	ÉTS	FRI	LS	SER	UGS
Biel		6–0	5–1	7–2	3–3	11–0	2–0	3–1	1–7
Cantonal Neuchâtel	2–2		1–1	3–1	1–0	3–1	1–4	2–0	1–2
Chaux-de-Fonds	0–2	1–0		2–0	2–4	4–2	0–2	3–3	0–1
Étoile Carouge	2–0	2–2	2–2		3–3	2–2	5–2	1–3	1–5
Étoile-Sporting	2–2	2–0	5–2	1–3		4–1	2–1	7–2	6–1
Fribourg	2–3	4–3	2–1	1–2	1–2		2–9	2–7	1–3
Lausanne-Sports	3–4	1–2	1–2	5–6	3–4	6–3		3–3	3–1
Servette	0–2	1–2	3–0	2–1	0–4	9–1	6–2		0–2
Urania	1–0	8–0	3–0	5–0	2–1	3–0	4–1	2–3	

Legend: Blue = home team win; Yellow = draw; Red = away team win.

== Final ==
=== Table ===
Pos	Team	Pld	W	D	L	GF	GA	GD	Pts
1	Young Boys Bern	2	1	1	0	2	0	+2	3
2	Grasshopper Club Zürich	2	1	0	1	3	2	+1	2
3	FC Urania Genf	2	0	1	1	0	3	−3	1

Source: rsssf.com

=== Results ===
Team 1	Score	Team 2
9 June 1929
Urania	0–0	Young Boys
16 June 1929
Grasshopper	3–0	Urania
30 June 1929
Young Boys	2–1	Grasshopper

Young Boys Bern won the championship.

== Sources ==
- Switzerland 1928-29 at RSSSF
