= Adolf Stelzer =

Swiss footballer (1908–1977)

Personal information
- Date of birth: 1 September 1908
- Date of death: 30 April 1977 (aged 68)
- Position: Defender

Senior career*
Years	Team	Apps	(Gls)
1929–1932	FC Zürich		
1932–1939	FC Lausanne-Sport		
1939–1942	FC La Chaux-de-Fonds		

International career
1930–1941	Switzerland	21	(1)
- * Club domestic league appearances and goals

Adolf Stelzer (1 September 1908 – 30 April 1977) was a Swiss footballer who played for Switzerland in the 1938 FIFA World Cup. He also played for FC Zürich, FC Lausanne-Sport, and FC La Chaux-de-Fonds.
