= Traugott Märki =

Swiss footballer

Personal information
- Full name: Traugott Märki
- Place of birth: Switzerland
- Position: Goalkeeper

Senior career*
Years	Team	Apps	(Gls)
1928–1931	FC Basel	1	(0)
- * Club domestic league appearances and goals

Traugott Märki was a Swiss footballer who played for FC Basel as goalkeeper.

Between the years 1928 and 1931 Märki played a total of four games for FC Basel. One of these four games was in the Swiss Serie A and the other three were friendly games. He played his domestic league debut for the club in the home game on 7 September 1930 as Basel won 2–1 against FC Bern.

== Sources ==
- Rotblau: Jahrbuch Saison 2017/2018. Publisher: FC Basel Marketing AG. ISBN 978-3-7245-2189-1
- Die ersten 125 Jahre. Publisher: Josef Zindel im Friedrich Reinhardt Verlag, Basel. ISBN 978-3-7245-2305-5
- Verein "Basler Fussballarchiv" Homepage
