= August Lehmann =

Swiss footballer (1909–1973)

Personal information
- Date of birth: 26 January 1909
- Date of death: 13 September 1973 (aged 64)
- Position: Defender

Senior career*
Years	Team	Apps	(Gls)
1928–1934	FC Zürich		
1934–1937	FC Lausanne-Sport		
1937–1942	Grasshopper Club Zürich		
1942–1943	FC St. Gallen		

International career
1930–1943	Switzerland	32	(2)
- * Club domestic league appearances and goals

August Lehmann (26 January 1909 in Zurich– 13 September 1973) was a Swiss footballer who played for Switzerland in the 1938 FIFA World Cup. He also played for FC Zürich, FC Lausanne-Sport, Grasshopper Club Zürich, and FC St. Gallen. A part-time professional, he also worked a night job as a dance band-leader in a Zurich hotel. He outplayed Stanley Matthews in a 2–1 win over England in 1938.
