= Alfred Enderlin =

Swiss-German footballer

Personal information
- Full name: Alfred Enderlin
- Date of birth: unknown
- Date of death: unknown
- Position: Striker

Senior career*
Years	Team	Apps	(Gls)
1926–1933	FC Basel	85	(39)
- * Club domestic league appearances and goals

Alfred Enderlin (* unknown; † unknown) was a Swiss-German footballer who played for FC Basel. He played mainly in the position of forward. He was known as Enderlin (I) because his brother Hermann Enderlin (II) played for Basel during the same period, but as a defender.

== Club career ==
Between the years 1926 and 1933 Enderlin (I) played a total of 138 games for Basel scoring 68 goals. 85 of these games were in the Swiss Serie A, 13 in the Swiss Cup and 40 were friendly games. He scored 39 goals in the domestic league, 11 in the cup and the other 18 were scored during the test games.

A well-documented curiosity was that at the end of Basel's 1929–30 season, the team set off on a Scandinavian football tour, including a visit to Germany. Six games were played in Norway, but the first was played in Leipzig. The team travelled with 15 players, their trainer Kertész and two functionaries. The journey started with a train ride on 2 June 1930 at quarter past seven in the morning from Basel and they arrived in Leipzig at half passed eight that evening. The game against VfB Leipzig was played the next evening. The following one and a half days were spent travelling by train, train, ship, train and train again to Drammen in Norway. Only a few hours after their arrival, the team played a game against a joint team Mjøndalen IF / SBK Drafn. The next day was a train journey to Porsgrunn and two matches in 24 hours. Following that they travelled per bus and then by ship in a 48-hour journey to Bergen for a match against SK Brann. Another ship voyage, this time to Stavanger, two games against Viking FK, then a ship voyage back to Bergen. Finally, the tour ended with three train journeys in three days, Bergen/Oslo/Berlin/Basel, arriving at home on 20 June. The result of this tour was seven games, four wins, one draw, two defeats and approximately 160 hours of travelling. Enderlin (I) was participant in this tour, but he played only in two of the games.

Enderlin (I) was a member of the Basel squad that won the Swiss Cup in the 1932–33 season. The final was played in the Hardturm stadium against Grasshopper Club. Basel won 4–3 and achieved the club's first ever national title. Enderlin (I) did not play in that game and ended his football playing time at the end of that season.

== Honours ==
- Swiss Cup winner: 1932–33

== Sources ==
- Rotblau: Jahrbuch Saison 2017/2018. Publisher: FC Basel Marketing AG. ISBN 978-3-7245-2189-1
