= Max Strasser =

Swiss footballer (1904-1967)

Personal information
- Full name: Max Strasser
- Date of birth: 23 May 1904
- Date of death: 16 November 1967 (aged 63)
- Place of death: Basel, Switzerland
- Position: Forward

Youth career
- until 1924: FC Basel

Senior career*
Years	Team	Apps	(Gls)
1924–1930	FC Basel	52	(4)
- * Club domestic league appearances and goals

Max Strasser (23 May 1904 – 16 November 1967) was a Swiss footballer who played for FC Basel. He played mainly as a forward, but also as a midfielder.

== Football career ==
Strasser played his youth football for FC Basel and then advanced to the first team before their 1924–25 season. He made his domestic league debut on 26 October 1924, in the home game at the Landhof against Concordia Basel. He scored his first goal for the club in the last game of the 1925–26 Serie A season on 29 May 1926 against the same opponents, Concordia. It was Basel's first goal of the match, which they won 3–0.

At the end of Basel's 1929–30 season, the team set off on a Scandinavian football tour, including a visit to Germany. Six games were played in Norway, but the first was played in Leipzig. The team travelled with 15 players, their trainer Kertész and two functionaries. The journey started with a train ride on 2 June 1930 at quarter past seven in the morning from Basel and they arrived in Leipzig at half passed eight that evening. The game against VfB Leipzig was played the next evening. The following one and a half days were spent travelling by train, train, ship, train and train again to Drammen in Norway. Only a few hours after their arrival, the team played a game against a joint team Mjøndalen IF / SBK Drafn. The next day was a train journey to Porsgrunn and two matches in 24 hours. Following that they travelled per bus and then by ship in a 48-hour journey to Bergen for a match against SK Brann. Another ship voyage, this time to Stavanger, two games against Viking FK, then a ship voyage back to Bergen. Finally, the tour ended with three train journeys in three days, Bergen/Oslo/Berlin/Basel, arriving at home on 20 June. The result of this tour was seven games, four wins, one draw, two defeats and approximately 160 hours of travelling. Strasser was participant in this tour, but played in only three of these games.

Between 1924 and 1930 Strasser played 86 games for Basel and scored 13 goals; 52 games were in the Swiss Serie A, 5 were in the Swiss Cup and 29 were friendlies. He scored 4 goals in the domestic league, 4 in the cup and the other 5 in friendlies.

== Sources ==
- Rotblau: Jahrbuch Saison 2017/2018. Publisher: FC Basel Marketing AG. ISBN 978-3-7245-2189-1
- Die ersten 125 Jahre. Publisher: Josef Zindel im Friedrich Reinhardt Verlag, Basel. ISBN 978-3-7245-2305-5
- Verein "Basler Fussballarchiv" Homepage
