= Walter Müller (footballer, born 1910) =

Swiss footballer

Personal information
- Date of birth: 14 December 1910
- Place of birth: Switzerland
- Date of death: Unknown
- Position: Forward

Senior career*
Years	Team	Apps	(Gls)
1928–1930	FC Basel	36	(12)
1930–1931	Concordia		
1932–1936	FC Basel	85	(24)
- * Club domestic league appearances and goals

Walter Müller (born 14 December 1910; date of death unknown) was a Swiss footballer who played for FC Basel. He played in the position of forward.

== Club career ==
Between the years 1928 and 1936 Müller played a total of 192 games for Basel, scoring a total of 64 goals. 121 of these games were in the Swiss Nationalliga and 27 were in the Swiss Cup. The other 43 were friendly games. He scored 36 goals in the domestic league, 17 in the Swiss Cup and the other 11 were scored during the test games.

A well-documented curiosity was that at the end of Basel's 1929–30 season, the team set off on a Scandinavian football tour, including a visit to Germany. Six games were played in Norway, but the first was played in Leipzig. The team travelled with 15 players, their trainer Kertész and two functionaries. The journey started with a train ride on 2 June 1930 at quarter past seven in the morning from Basel and they arrived in Leipzig at half passed eight that evening. The game against VfB Leipzig was played the next evening. The following one and a half days were spent travelling by train, train, ship, train and train again to Drammen in Norway. Only a few hours after their arrival, the team played a game against a joint team Mjøndalen IF / SBK Drafn. The next day was a train journey to Porsgrunn and two matches in 24 hours. Following that they travelled per bus and then by ship in a 48-hour journey to Bergen for a match against SK Brann. Another ship voyage, this time to Stavanger, two games against Viking FK, then a ship voyage back to Bergen. Finally, the tour ended with three train journeys in three days, Bergen/Oslo/Berlin/Basel, arriving at home on 20 June. The result of this tour was seven games, four wins, one draw, two defeats and approximately 160 hours of travelling. Müller was participant in this tour. He played in six games and scored two goals.

He played for Concordia Basel in the season 1930–31, but then returned to Basel. He was a member of the Basel team that won the Swiss Cup in the 1932–33 season. The final was played in the Hardturm stadium against Grasshopper Club. Basel won 4–3 and achieved the club's first ever national title. In the 69th minute of the final Müller scored the fourth Basel goal.

== Honours ==
- Swiss Cup winner: 1932–33

== Sources ==
- Rotblau: Jahrbuch Saison 2017/2018. Publisher: FC Basel Marketing AG. ISBN 978-3-7245-2189-1
- Verein "Basler Fussballarchiv" Homepage
