= Gyula Kertész =

Hungarian football player and coach (1888–1982)

Personal information
- Date of birth: 29 February 1888
- Place of birth: Kiskálna, Austria-Hungary
- Date of death: 1 May 1982 (aged 94)
- Place of death: New York City, U.S.
- Position: Winger

Senior career*
Years	Team	Apps	(Gls)
1906–1912	MTK Budapest		

International career
1912	Hungary	1	(0)

Managerial career
- 1921–1934: SC Union 03 Altona
- 1924–1928: SC Victoria Hamburg
- 1928–1930: FC Basel
- 1931–1932: Hamburger SV
- 1932–1933: VfB Leipzig
- * Club domestic league appearances and goals

Gyula Kertész (also known as Julius Kertész; 29 February 1888 – 1 May 1982) was a Hungarian football player and coach. He played as a winger for MTK Budapest, alongside his two brothers, Vilmos and Adolf, and made one appearance for the Hungary national team. He later coached several clubs in Germany.

== Playing career ==
Kertész was born in Kiskálna in what was then Hungary, and was Jewish.

Kertész played club football for MTK Budapest in 1906–07 to 1911–12. He also played international football for Hungary, where he earned one cap against Austria in 1912.

In 1911, to supplement his income, along with fellow MTK player Izidor Kürschner he set up a photographic studio.

== Coaching career ==
Kertész coached several clubs in Germany, such as Union Altona (1921–1924) and Victoria Hamburg (1924–1928), and in other countries including France and Scandinavia during the 1920s. He managed Swiss side FC Basel between 1928 and 1930. In January 1931 he took over at Hamburger SV, where he successfully revamped the team, adding Rudolf Noack and other promising new players until he was appointed by VfB Leipzig in the summer of 1932. After his contract had been dissolved by mutual agreement in May 1933, Kertész left Germany and emigrated to the United States.

In the US, he worked in the record industry. His son, who called himself George Curtiss, was a leading manager at Remington Records.

== See also ==
- List of Jewish footballers
