= FC Bern =

Swiss football club

- Full name: Fussballclub Bern 1894
- Founded: 1894
- Ground: Stadion Neufeld
- Capacity: 7,500
- Chairman: Beat DALLA-VECCHIA
- Coach: Johan Berisha
- League: 3. Liga (Bern/Jura)
- Website: http://www.fcbern1894.ch

Fussballclub Bern (FC Bern) is a football team from Bern, the capital city of Switzerland, who currently play in the Gruppe 1, in the Bern/Jura canton.

In 1921, the club won the Och Cup (that was considered as the former Swiss Cup). The Och Cup ran only for two years. In 1925, in a single game, FC Bern won the cup against the other winner of the Och Cup.

== Honours ==
- Swiss Cup
  - Runners-up (1): 1925–26
