= 1953–54 Swiss Cup =

Tournament details
- Country: Switzerland

Final positions
- Champions: La Chaux-de-Fonds
- Runners-up: Fribourg

The 1953–54 Swiss Cup was the 29th season of Switzerland's football cup competition, organised annually since 1925–26 by the Swiss Football Association.

== Overview ==
This season's cup competition began with the games of the first round, played on the week-end of the 4 October 1953. The competition was to be completed on Easter Monday, 19 April 1954, with the final, which was traditionally held at the former Wankdorf Stadium in Bern. The modus of the competition had been modified for this season. Now, the clubs from the 1954–55 Swiss 1. Liga joined the competition in the first round, together with the qualified clubs from the lower divisions. The clubs from this season's Nationalliga A (NLA) and from this season's Nationalliga B (NLB) were given byes for the first three rounds, before it had been just two. These teams joined the competition in the fourth round, which was played during January 1954. However, during the season it was noted that the change in the modus did not improve the competition, but in fact had exactly the opposite effect. Therefore, after just one season, things would return to the previous modus.

The matches were played in a knockout format. In the event of a draw after 90 minutes, the match went into extra time. In the event of a draw at the end of extra time, a replay was foreseen and this was played on the visiting team's pitch. If the replay ended in a draw after extra time, a toss of a coin would establish the team that qualified for the next round.

== Round 1 ==
In the first phase, the lower league teams that had qualified themselves for the competition through their regional football association's regional cup competitions or their association's requirements, competed here together with the clubs from the 1954–55 Swiss 1. Liga. Whenever possible, the draw respected local regionalities. The first round was played on the weekend of 4 October 1953.

=== Summary ===
Team 1	Score	Team 2
4 October 1953
FC Forward Morges	2–1	Vevey Sports
FC Plan-les-Ouates	1–4	Monthey
SC Derendingen	4–6 (a.e.t.)	FC Bassecourt
Delémont	0–2	FC Porrentruy
Chur	0–0 (a.e.t.)	FC Wetzikon
Nordstern	1–1 (a.e.t.)	Concordia
Red Star	0–4	Blue Stars
FC Olten	1–5	FC Rapid Lugano
US Bienne-Boujean	4–3	FC Luterbach
CS La Tour-de-Peilz	1–2	Sion
FC La Neuveville	3–1	Lengnau
FC Victoria Bern	4–3	FC Stade Payerne
FC Brunnen	0–2	SC Zug
Baden	3–0	FC Lachen
Uster	3–2 (a.e.t.)	Arbon
Schöftland	3–0	Frauenfeld

Replays

Team 1	Score	Team 2
4 October 1953
FC Wetzikon	0–1	Chur
Concordia	0–3	Nordstern

== Round 2 ==
=== Summary ===
Team 1	Score	Team 2
18 October 1953
FC Forward Morges	3–1	Monthey
FC Bassecourt	2–3	FC Porrentruy
Chur	0–3	Nordstern
Blue Stars	1–0	FC Rapid Lugano
US Bienne-Boujean	5–2	Sion
FC La Neuveville	2–1	FC Victoria Bern
SC Zug	0–0 (a.e.t.)	Baden
Uster	1–2	Schöftland

Replay

Team 1	Score	Team 2
25 October 1953
Baden	2–1	SC Zug

== Round 3 ==
=== Summary ===
Team 1	Score	Team 2
8 November 1953
FC Forward Morges	4–1	FC Porrentruy
Nordstern	2–0	Blue Stars
US Bienne-Boujean	4–2	FC La Neuveville
Baden	5–1	Schöftland

== Round 4 ==
The teams from the NLA and NLB entered the cup competition in this round, together with the remaining four lower classed teams from the first three rounds. Whenever possible, the draw respected local regionalities. The modus was to be modified for the following season, so that more lower-classed teams could advance further and have the chance to play against the higher-classed teams. The fourth round was played, with two exceptions, on the week-end of 10 January 1954.

=== Summary ===
Team 1	Score	Team 2
3 January 1954
ES Malley	0–2	Servette
10 January 1954
La Chaux-de-Fonds	13–1	FC Forward Morges
Urania Genève Sport	3–2	Yverdon-Sport
Fribourg	6–2 (a.e.t.)	US Bienne-Boujean
Lausanne-Sport	5–1	Cantonal Neuchâtel
Basel	0–1	Grenchen
Thun	2–1	Luzern
Bern	2–0	Solothurn
Nordstern	3–0	Biel-Bienne
Young Boys	5–1	Aarau
Zürich	1–2	Bellinzona
Young Fellows	3–1	Lugano
St. Gallen	0–0 abandoned	Winterthur
Schaffhausen	0–3	Chiasso
Locarno	4–5	Grasshopper Club
17 January 1954
FC Wil	5–1	Baden

- The match St. Gallen–Winterthur was abandoned during the 9th minute of play due to snow.

Replay

Team 1	Score	Team 2
17 January 1954
St. Gallen	3–2	Winterthur

=== Matches ===
3 January 1954

ES Malley	0–2	Servette
	Servette summary	(0:1) Pasteur (0:2) Pasteur

Centre sportif de la Tuilière, Malley

10 January 1954
14:30

Basel	0–1	Grenchen
	FCB summary	88' (0:1) Pfister

Landhof, Basel
Attendance: 5,200
Referee: (Switzerland) Gino Bergamini (Viganello)

10 January 1954

Young Boys	5–1	Aarau
Goal	FCA summary	Goal

Wankdorf Stadium, Bern

10 January 1954

Zürich	1–2	Bellinzona
Leutenegger 17' (1:0)	FCZ summary	37' (1:1) Athos Simoni; 50' (1:2) Renato Zurmühle

Letzigrund, Zürich
Attendance: 1,800
Referee: (Switzerland) Roger Rapin (Lausanne)

== Round 5 ==
=== Summary ===
Team 1	Score	Team 2
17 January 1954
Chiasso	1–1 (a.e.t.)	La Chaux-de-Fonds
Young Boys	7–0	Urania Genève Sport
Grasshopper Club	7–2	Bellinzona
Lausanne-Sport	6–1	Thun
Servette	3–2	Bern
24 January 1954
Young Fellows	3–1	Grenchen
Fribourg	2–1	FC Wil
St. Gallen	1–3	Nordstern

Replay

Team 1	Score	Team 2
7 February 1954
La Chaux-de-Fonds	4–1	Chiasso

=== Matches ===
17 January 1954

Servette	3–2	Bern
Epp; Duret; Duret	Servette summary	Goal

Stade des Charmilles, Geneva

== Quarter-finals ==
=== Summary ===
Team 1	Score	Team 2
14 February 1954
Servette	2–4	La Chaux-de-Fonds
Nordstern	1–4	Young Boys
Grasshopper Club	2–0	Lausanne-Sport
Fribourg	4–3	Young Fellows

=== Matches ===
14 February 1954

Servette	2–4	La Chaux-de-Fonds
Epp; Tamini	Servette summary	Goal

Stade des Charmilles, Geneva

== Semi-finals ==
=== Summary ===
Team 1	Score	Team 2
28 March 1954
La Chaux-de-Fonds	4–2	Young Boys
Grasshopper Club	1–1 (a.e.t.)	Fribourg

Replay

Team 1	Score	Team 2
4 April 1954
Fribourg	3–1	Grasshopper Club

=== Matches ===
28 March 1954

La Chaux-de-Fonds	4–2	Young Boys
Mauron 18' (1:1); Morand 30' (2:1); Fesselet 81' (3:2); Antenen 83' (4:2)	Summary	13' (0:1) Sing; 74' (2:2) Meier

Centre Sportif de la Charrière, La Chaux-de-Fonds

28 March 1954

Grasshopper Club	1–1 (a.e.t.)	Fribourg
Vonlanthen 7' (1:0)	Summary	76' (1:1) Vonlanden

Hardturm, Zürich

4 April 1954

Fribourg	3–1	Grasshopper Club
Perruchoud 34' (1:0); Streiner 57' (2:0); Vonlanden 86' (3:1)	Summary	84' (2:1) Ballaman

Stade Universitaire Saint-Léonard, Fribourg

== Final ==
The final was held at the former Wankdorf Stadium in Bern on Easter Monday 1954.

=== Summary ===
Team 1	Score	Team 2
19 April 1954
La Chaux-de-Fonds	2–0	Fribourg

=== Telegram ===
19 April 1954

La Chaux-de-Fonds	2–0	Fribourg
Fesselet 31' (1:0); Coutaz 77' (2:0)	Fussball-Schweiz summary

Wankdorf Stadium, Bern
Attendance: 26,000
Referee: (Switzerland) Emilio Guidi (Bellinzona)

La Chaux-de-Fonds won the cup and this was the club's third cup title to this date. Three weeks later, on 9 May, they also won the Swiss league championship. This was the club's first domestic double.

== Further in Swiss football ==
- 1953–54 Nationalliga A
- 1953–54 Swiss 1. Liga

== Sources ==
- Fussball-Schweiz
- FCB Cup games 1953–54 at fcb-achiv.ch
- Switzerland 1953–54 at RSSSF

Preceded by 1952–53	Swiss Cup seasons	Succeeded by 1954–55
