= 1954–55 Swiss Cup =

Tournament details
- Country: Switzerland

Final positions
- Champions: La Chaux-de-Fonds
- Runners-up: Thun

The 1954–55 Swiss Cup was the 30th season of Switzerland's football cup competition, organised annually since 1925–26 by the Swiss Football Association.

== Overview ==
This season's cup competition began with the games of the first round, played on the week-end of the 26 September 1954. The competition was to be completed on Easter Monday, 11 April 1955, with the final, which was traditionally held at the former Wankdorf Stadium in Bern. The clubs from the 1954–55 Swiss 1. Liga were given a bye for the first round, they joined the competition in the second round on the week-end of 10 October. The clubs from this season's Nationalliga A (NLA) and from this season's Nationalliga B (NLB) were given byes for the first two rounds. These teams joined the competition in the third round, which was played on the week-end of 7 November.

The matches were played in a knockout format. In the event of a draw after 90 minutes, the match went into extra time. In the event of a draw at the end of extra time, a replay was foreseen and this was played on the visiting team's pitch. If the replay ended in a draw after extra time, a toss of a coin would establish the team that qualified for the next round.

== Round 1 ==
In the first phase, the lower league teams that had qualified themselves for the competition through their regional football association's regional cup competitions or their association's requirements, competed here. Whenever possible, the draw respected local regionalities. The first round was played on the weekend of 26 September 1954.

=== Summary ===
Team 1	Score	Team 2
26 September 1954
FC Geneva (GE)	1–2	Signal FC (Bernex)
CS International Genève	0–6	Stade Nyonnais
FC Renens	6–1	FC Prangins
FC Chailly/Lausanne	4–1	Le Mont
FC Le Sentier	7–3	FC Grandson
FC Saint-Maurice	0–2	Bulle
FC Estavayer-le-Lac	2–3	FC Stade Payerne
FC La Neuveville	0–4	FC Tavannes
FC Tramelan	3–4	FC Bassecourt
SC Aegerten-Brügg	0–1	FC Grünstern (Ipsach)
FC Flamatt	0–3	Bümpliz
FC Konolfingen	3–2	SC Sparta Bern
FC Zuchwil	0–1	FC Gerlafingen
Wangen bei Olten	2–0	FC Schönenwerd
FC Birsfelden	3–1	SV Sissach
Binningen	1–2	FC Pratteln
FC Allschwil	6–0	US Bottecchia BS
FC Riehen	7–0	Breitenrain
FC Seon	4–1	FC Oberentfelden
Schöftland	4–0	Zofingen
FC Dietikon	0–3	Wettingen
Kickers Luzern	2–3	FC Wädenswil
FC Wiedikon	1–0	FC Wollishofen
FC Lachen	4–0	Rapperswil-Jona
SV Höngg	2–0	SC Veltheim
Uster	2–1	FC Neuhausen
Frauenfeld	3–1	FC Wallisellen
FC Amriswil	2–4	Kreuzlingen
FC Uzwil	1–2	Arbon
FC Fortuna (SG)	4–3	Herisau
FC Wattwil	1–2	Chur
FC Perlen	3–2	FC Altdorf (Uri)
AS Coldrerio	1–2	FC Solduno
FC Lutry	FF awd 3–0	FC Saint-Léonard
FC Langenthal	2–2	FC Victoria Bern
3 October 1954
FC Couvet	1–5	Neuchâtel Xamax

Replay

Team 1	Score	Team 2
3 October 1954
FC Victoria Bern	2–1	FC Langenthal

== Round 2 ==
The clubs from the 1955–56 Swiss 1. Liga had been given a bye for the first round, they now joined the competition here, in the second round.

=== Summary ===
Team 1	Score	Team 2
10 October 1954
FC Allschwil	0–5	FC Porrentruy
FC Lachen	4–1 (a.e.t.)	US Pro Daro
FC Stade Payerne	2–1	Montreux-Sports
FC Renens	0–3	Monthey
FC Riehen	1–0	SC Kleinhüningen
FC Rorschach	3–0	Arbon
Stade Nyonnais	3–1	Sion
FC Wädenswil	0–2	Mendrisio
FC Fortuna (SG)	2–3	Brühl
FC Wil	3–2 (a.e.t.)	Kreuzlingen
FC Oerlikon (ZH)	4–2	FC Wiedikon
FC Küsnacht (ZH)	2–1	Frauenfeld
Chur	3–2	Red Star
Baden	5–0	Uster
Wettingen	1–4	SC Zug
Aarau	4–2	SV Höngg
FC Olten	3–1	FC Seon
Burgdorf	6–2	FC Victoria Bern
FC Konolfingen	1–4	Moutier
Wangen bei Olten	1–4	FC Wyler Bern
Concordia	3–2	FC Birsfelden
Lengnau	3–2	FC Gerlafingen
Central Fribourg	4–2 (a.e.t.)	Schöftland
Martigny-Sports	5–2	FC Lutry
FC Sierre	3–2	FC Chailly/Lausanne
Neuchâtel Xamax	3–2	FC Forward Morges
US Lausanne	4–2	Signal FC (Bernex)
Bulle	0–5	Vevey Sports
CS La Tour-de-Peilz	5–2	FC Le Sentier
US Bienne-Boujean	1–2	FC Bassecourt
Saint-Imier-Sports	3–1	Bümpliz
FC Grünstern (Ipsach)	3–2	FC Nidau
Bodio	3–1	FC Perlen
Delémont	6–1	FC Pratteln
FC Tavannes	1–1 (a.e.t.)	FC Aigle
FC Rapid Lugano	0–0 (a.e.t.)	FC Solduno

Replays

Team 1	Score	Team 2
17 October 1954
FC Aigle	1–3	FC Tavannes
FC Solduno	1–3	FC Rapid Lugano

=== Matches ===
10 October 1954

Aarau	4–2	SV Höngg
Goal	FCA summary	Goal

Stadion Brügglifeld, Aarau

== Round 3 ==
The teams from the NLA and NLB entered the cup competition in this round. However, the teams from the NLA were seeded and could not be drawn against each other. Whenever possible, the draw respected local regionalities. The third round was played on the week-end of 7 November 1954.

=== Summary ===
Team 1	Score	Team 2
7 November 1954
Lausanne-Sport	8–1	FC Stade Payerne
US Lausanne	0–5	ES Malley
Aarau	0–1 (a.e.t.)	St. Gallen
Winterthur	6–2	FC Küsnacht (ZH)
Chiasso	1–0	FC Oerlikon (ZH)
Brühl	0–2	Grasshopper Club
Biel-Bienne	4–0	Moutier
FC Riehen	0–6	Basel
FC Rorschach	0–3	Zürich
FC Wil	1–2	Blue Stars
Delémont	3–4	Lengnau
FC Porrentruy	3–0	Grenchen
FC Sierre	5–2	Stade Nyonnais
La Chaux-de-Fonds	6–2	CS La Tour-de-Peilz
Cantonal Neuchâtel	3–2	Central Fribourg
Urania Genève Sport	7–1	FC Grünstern (Ipsach)
Young Boys	9–0	Neuchâtel Xamax
Vevey Sports	0–1 (a.e.t.)	FC Helvetia Bern
Monthey	2–10	Servette
Fribourg	6–1	FC Tavannes
Luzern	4–1	SC Zug
FC Rapid Lugano	0–3	Bellinzona
Locarno	1–0	Bodio
Chur	0–4	Young Fellows
FC Bassecourt	2–0	Solothurn
Nordstern	1–0	Concordia
Thun	3–0	Martigny-Sports
Saint-Imier-Sports	2–1 (a.e.t.)	Bern
FC Lachen	0–2	Schaffhausen
Lugano	0–1	Mendrisio
Yverdon-Sport	2–2 (a.e.t.)	Burgdorf
FC Olten	1–0; Annulled	Baden

Team 1	Score	Team 2
14 November 1954
Burgdorf	2–4	Yverdon-Sport
21 November 1954
FC Olten	4–1	Baden

=== Matches ===
7 November 1954

Aarau	0–1 (a.e.t.)	St. Gallen
	FCA summary	Goal

Stadion Brügglifeld, Aarau

7 November 1954
12:30

FC Riehen	0–6	Basel
	FCB summary	Hügi (II) 5' (0:1); Fitze 23' (0:2); 30' (o.g. 0:3); Keller 32' (0:4); Bannwart 33' (0:5); Keller 62' (0:6)

Landhof, Basel
Attendance: 3,000
Referee: (Switzerland) Walter Frieden (Bern)
- Note: FC Riehen waived the home advantage.

7 November 1954

FC Rorschach	0–3	Zürich
	FCZ summary	55' (0:1) Leimgruber; 60' (0:2) Beerli; 85' (0:3) Bosshard

Letzigrund, Zürich
Attendance: 3,000
Referee: (Switzerland) Girelli (Chur)

7 November 1954

Monthey	2–10	Servette
Goal	Servette summary	1x Dutoit; 1x Neury; 4x Epp; 2x Duret; 1x Friedländer

Stade Philippe Pottier, Monthey

== Round 4 ==
=== Summary ===
Team 1	Score	Team 2
5 December 1954
Lausanne-Sport	5–0	ES Malley
St. Gallen	3–1	Winterthur
Chiasso	2–0	Grasshopper Club
Biel-Bienne	4–0	Yverdon-Sport
Basel	2–0	FC Olten
Zürich	2–0	Blue Stars
Lengnau	2–0	FC Porrentruy
FC Sierre	1–9	La Chaux-de-Fonds
Cantonal Neuchâtel	1–2	Urania Genève Sport
Young Boys	1–0	FC Helvetia Bern
Servette	1–2	Fribourg
Locarno	1–2	Young Fellows
FC Bassecourt	0–2	Nordstern
Thun	8–2	Saint-Imier-Sports
Schaffhausen	4–2	Mendrisio
Luzern	2–2 (a.e.t.)	Bellinzona

Replay

Team 1	Score	Team 2
26 December 1954
Bellinzona	3–2	Luzern

=== Matches ===
5 December 1954
14:30

Basel	2–0	FC Olten
Hügi (II) 17' (1:0); Weber 19' (2:0)	FCB summary

Landhof, Basel
Attendance: 2,000
Referee: (Switzerland) W. Werner (St. Gallen)

5 December 1954

Zürich	2–0	Blue Stars
Viđak 33' (1:0); Fottner 90' (2:0)	FCZ summary

Letzigrund, Zürich
Attendance: 2,500
Referee: (Switzerland) Emilio Guidi (Bellinzona)

5 December 1954

Servette	1–2	Fribourg
Mezzena	Servette summary	Goal

Stade des Charmilles, Geneva

== Round 5 ==
=== Summary ===
Team 1	Score	Team 2
26 December 1954
Lengnau	1–3	La Chaux-de-Fonds
2 January 1955
Lausanne-Sport	9–1	St. Gallen
Chiasso	3–2	Biel-Bienne
Basel	1–4	Zürich
Urania Genève Sport	2–1	Young Boys
Fribourg	1–0	Bellinzona
Locarno	1–5	Nordstern
Thun	4–1	Schaffhausen

=== Matches ===
2 January 1955
14:30

Basel	1–4	Zürich
Hügi (II) 68' (pen. 1:1)	FCB summary FCZ summary	27' (0:1) Feller; 73' (1:2) Beerli; 74' (1:3) Beerli; 89' (1:4) Beerli

Landhof, Basel
Attendance: 5,000
Referee: (Switzerland) Victor Werner Schicker (Bern)

== Quarter-finals ==
=== Summary ===
Team 1	Score	Team 2
13 February 1955
Lausanne-Sport	3–2 (a.e.t.)	Chiasso
Urania Genève Sport	0–2 (a.e.t.)	Fribourg
Nordstern	1–2	Thun
Zürich	0–0 (a.e.t.)	La Chaux-de-Fonds

Replay

Team 1	Score	Team 2
20 February 1955
La Chaux-de-Fonds	4–0	Zürich

=== Matches ===
13 February 1955

Zürich	0–0 (a.e.t.)	La Chaux-de-Fonds
Koch (yellow card)	FCZ summary

Letzigrund, Zürich
Attendance: 10,000
Referee: (Switzerland) Gottfried Dienst (Basel)

20 February 1955

La Chaux-de-Fonds	4–0	Zürich
Jean-Pierre Gerber 44' (1:0); Antenen 60' (2:0); Morand 84' (3:0); Mauron 89' (4:0)	FCZ summary

Centre Sportif de la Charrière, La Chaux-de-Fonds
Attendance: 3,000
Referee: (Switzerland) Emilio Guidi (Bellinzona)

== Semi-finals ==
=== Summary ===
Team 1	Score	Team 2
20 March 1955
Lausanne-Sport	1–3	La Chaux-de-Fonds
Fribourg	0–1	Thun

=== Matches ===
20 March 1955

Lausanne-Sport	1–3	La Chaux-de-Fonds
Rey 73' (1:3)	Summary	10' (0:1) Kauer; 15' (0:2) Antenen; 38' (0:3) Antenen

Pontaise, Lausanne

20 March 1955

Fribourg	0–1	Thun
	Summary	85' (o.g.) Poffet

Stade Universitaire Saint-Léonard, Fribourg

== Final ==
The final was held at the former Wankdorf Stadium in Bern on Easter Monday 1955.

=== Summary ===
Team 1	Score	Team 2
11 April 1955
La Chaux-de-Fonds	3–1	Thun

=== Telegram ===
11 April 1955
15:00

La Chaux-de-Fonds	3–1	Thun
Mauron 3' (1:0); Mauron 13' (2:0); Kauer 19' (3:0)	Fussball-Schweiz summary	71' (3:1) Thommen

Wankdorf Stadium, Bern
Attendance: 25,000
Referee: (Switzerland) Fritz Buchmüller (Zürich)

The reigning Cup holders La Chaux-de-Fonds won the cup for the second year running and this was the club's fourth cup title to this date. Two months later, on 12 June, they also won the Swiss league championship. As they had won the double the previous season, it was their second double in two years.

== Further in Swiss football ==
- 1954–55 Nationalliga A
- 1954–55 Swiss 1. Liga

== Sources ==
- Fussball-Schweiz
- FCB Cup games 1954–55 at fcb-achiv.ch
- Switzerland 1954–55 at RSSSF

Preceded by 1953–54	Swiss Cup seasons	Succeeded by 1955–56
