= 1954–55 Nationalliga A =

Swiss football season

Nationalliga A
- Season: 1954–55
- Champions: La Chaux-de-Fonds
- Relegated: Thun; Luzern
- Top goalscorer: Marcel Mauron (La Chaux-de-Fonds); 30 goals

Nationalliga B
- Season: 1954–55
- Champions: Urania Genève Sport
- Promoted: Urania Genève Sport; Schaffhausen
- Relegated: Locarno; Yverdon-Sport
- Top goalscorer: Harry Brühlmann (Winterthur); 26 goals

The following is the summary of the Swiss National League in the 1954–55 football season, both Nationalliga A and Nationalliga B. This was the 58th season of top-tier and the 57th season of second-tier football in Switzerland.

== Overview ==
The Swiss Football Association (ASF/SFV) had 28 member clubs at this time which were divided into two divisions of 14 teams each. The teams played a double round-robin to decide their table positions. Two points were awarded for a win and one point was awarded for a draw. The top tier (NLA) was contested by the top 12 teams from the previous 1953–54 season and the two newly promoted teams Lugano and Thun. The last two teams in the league table at the end of the season were to be relegated.

The second-tier (NLB) was contested by the two teams that had been relegated from the NLA at the end of the last season, these were FC Bern and Biel-Bienne, the ten teams that had been in third to twelfth position last season and the two newly promoted teams Blue Stars and Nordstern. The top two teams at the end of the season would be promoted to the 1955–56 NLA and the two last placed teams would be relegated to the 1955–56 Swiss 1. Liga.

== Nationalliga A ==
=== Teams, locations ===
Team	Based in	Canton	Stadium	Capacity
FC Basel	Basel	Basel-Stadt	Landhof	4,000
AC Bellinzona	Bellinzona	Ticino	Stadio Comunale Bellinzona	5,000
FC Chiasso	Chiasso	Ticino	Stadio Comunale Riva IV	4,000
Grasshopper Club Zürich	Zürich	Zürich	Hardturm	20,000
FC Fribourg	Fribourg	Fribourg	Stade Universitaire	9,000
FC Grenchen	Grenchen	Solothurn	Stadium Brühl	10,900
FC La Chaux-de-Fonds	La Chaux-de-Fonds	Neuchâtel	Centre Sportif de la Charrière	10,000
FC Lausanne-Sport	Lausanne	Vaud	Pontaise	30,000
FC Lugano	Lugano	Ticino	Cornaredo Stadium	6,330
FC Luzern	Lucerne	Lucerne	Stadion Allmend	25,000
Servette FC	Geneva	Geneva	Stade des Charmilles	27,000
FC Thun	Thun	Bern	Stadion Lachen	10,350
BSC Young Boys	Bern	Bern	Wankdorf Stadium	56,000
FC Zürich	Zürich	Zürich	Letzigrund	25,000

=== Final league table ===
Pos	Team	Pld	W	D	L	GF	GA	GD	Pts	Qualification
1	La Chaux-de-Fonds	26	19	4	3	99	46	+53	42	Swiss Champions and Swiss Cup winners
2	Lausanne-Sport	26	16	6	4	75	35	+40	38	
3	Grasshopper Club	26	14	5	7	80	43	+37	33	
4	Zürich	26	13	4	9	52	48	+4	30	
5	Young Boys	26	10	8	8	65	53	+12	28	
6	Servette	26	11	4	11	54	53	+1	26	Selected for the 1955–56 European Cup first round
7	Bellinzona	26	8	10	8	28	29	−1	26	
8	Chiasso	26	10	5	11	48	58	−10	25	
9	Basel	26	10	4	12	47	52	−5	24	
10	Fribourg	26	9	3	14	40	61	−21	21	
11	Lugano	26	8	4	14	47	79	−32	20	
12	Grenchen	26	7	5	14	35	48	−13	19	
13	Thun	26	6	6	14	35	65	−30	18	Relegated to 1955–56 Nationalliga B
14	Luzern	26	6	2	18	38	73	−35	14	Relegated to 1955–56 Nationalliga B

Source: RSSSF
Rules for classification: 1) Points; 2) Goal difference within the league, however with play-off for qualifiers;

=== Results ===
Home \ Away	BAS	BEL	CDF	CHI	FRI	GCZ	GRE	LS	LUG	LUZ	SER	THU	YB	ZÜR
Basel		1–1	4–3	0–2	2–0	3–2	3–1	5–2	4–1	3–1	3–2	3–2	1–1	0–3
Bellinzona	1–0		0–0	0–1	0–1	0–0	1–0	1–2	0–1	3–0	0–0	4–2	3–1	2–0
La Chaux-de-Fonds	4–1	2–2		2–2	3–2	6–1	5–2	3–1	7–2	5–0	3–2	7–1	7–2	8–3
Chiasso	3–1	0–0	2–4		2–0	2–2	3–0	0–1	5–2	4–2	2–1	1–2	1–6	4–1
Fribourg	2–0	3–0	1–6	2–0		3–3	2–3	1–2	2–1	2–1	0–3	3–1	3–2	2–2
Grasshopper Club	3–1	3–3	4–1	7–0	10–0		3–0	1–1	2–2	5–2	5–1	3–1	3–2	2–3
Grenchen	3–1	0–1	0–2	5–0	1–1	0–2		1–1	0–1	2–1	1–1	0–1	1–1	1–2
Lausanne-Sports	1–1	1–0	4–4	6–0	6–0	3–1	3–1		5–1	9–0	2–0	2–2	2–1	4–3
Lugano	2–3	0–2	1–3	4–3	3–2	0–5	1–2	1–3		5–2	4–3	1–1	3–3	2–1
Luzern	2–1	3–1	1–2	4–2	1–3	0–2	2–2	0–3	4–4		3–0	1–2	1–2	1–2
Servette	2–2	1–1	2–4	1–5	2–1	2–1	2–3	4–3	4–0	2–1		6–1	4–2	4–3
Thun	2–1	1–1	2–4	0–0	3–1	1–5	1–2	0–6	4–1	0–1	0–3		1–1	0–3
Young Boys	2–1	5–0	4–2	2–2	2–0	3–2	4–3	2–2	7–0	1–3	1–2	2–2		4–2
Zürich	3–1	1–1	0–2	3–2	1–0	3–1	0–1	0–0	2–1	4–1	2–0	3–2	2–2	

Source: RSSSF
Legend: Blue = home team win; Yellow = draw; Red = away team win.

=== Topscorers ===
Rank	Player	Nat.	Goals	Club
1.	Marcel Mauron	(Switzerland)	30	La Chaux-de-Fonds
2.	Kurt Scheller	(Switzerland)	23	Young Boys
3.	Josef Hügi	(Switzerland)	20	Basel
4.	Branislav Vukosavljević	(Socialist Federal Republic of Yugoslavia)	18	Grasshopper Club
5.	Ferdinando Riva	(Switzerland)	17	Chiasso
6.	Charles Antenen	(Switzerland)	16	La Chaux-de-Fonds
7.	Bram Appel	(Switzerland)	15	Lausanne-Sport
8.	Augusto Satori	(Switzerland)	14	Bellinzona
8.	Hans-Peter Friedländer	(Switzerland)	14	Servette
8.	Gilbert Fesselet	(Switzerland)	14	La Chaux-de-Fonds
8.	Francesco Chiesa	(Switzerland)	14	Chiasso

== Nationalliga B ==
=== Teams, locations ===
Team	Based in	Canton	Stadium	Capacity
FC Bern	Bern	Bern	Stadion Neufeld	14,000
FC Biel-Bienne	Biel/Bienne	Bern	Stadion Gurzelen	5,500
FC Blue Stars Zürich	Zürich	Zürich	Hardhof	1,000
FC Cantonal Neuchâtel	Neuchâtel	Neuchâtel	Stade de la Maladière	25,500
FC Locarno	Locarno	Ticino	Stadio comunale Lido	5,000
ES FC Malley	Malley	Vaud	Centre sportif de la Tuilière	1,500
FC Nordstern Basel	Basel	Basel-Stadt	Rankhof	7,600
FC Schaffhausen	Schaffhausen	Schaffhausen	Stadion Breite	7,300
FC Solothurn	Solothurn	Solothurn	Stadion FC Solothurn	6,750
FC St. Gallen	St. Gallen	St. Gallen	Espenmoos	11,000
Urania Genève Sport	Genève	Geneva	Stade de Frontenex	4,000
FC Winterthur	Winterthur	Zürich	Schützenwiese	8,550
FC Young Fellows	Zürich	Zürich	Utogrund	2,850
Yverdon-Sport FC	Yverdon-les-Bains	Vaud	Stade Municipal	6,600

=== Final league table ===
Pos	Team	Pld	W	D	L	GF	GA	GD	Pts	Qualification
1	Urania Genève Sport	26	16	5	5	51	35	+16	37	NLB Champions and promoted to 1955–56 Nationalliga A
2	FC Schaffhausen	26	13	6	7	50	37	+13	32	Play-off for promotion
3	FC Biel-Bienne	26	15	2	9	63	40	+23	32	Play-off for promotion
4	FC Nordstern Basel	26	14	3	9	54	43	+11	31	
5	ES FC Malley	26	13	4	9	64	54	+10	30	
6	Young Fellows Zürich	26	11	6	9	51	45	+6	28	
7	FC Winterthur	26	12	3	11	72	66	+6	27	
8	FC Cantonal Neuchâtel	26	11	3	12	54	56	−2	25	
9	FC St. Gallen	26	11	2	13	49	57	−8	24	
10	FC Blue Stars Zürich	26	6	11	9	44	51	−7	23	
11	FC Solothurn	26	8	6	12	49	52	−3	22	
12	FC Bern	26	7	6	13	37	48	−11	20	Play-out against relegation
13	FC Locarno	26	5	10	11	39	54	−15	20	Play-out against relegation
14	Yverdon-Sport FC	26	3	7	16	25	64	−39	13	Relegated to 1955–56 1. Liga

Source: RSSSF
Rules for classification: 1) Points; 2) Goal difference within the league, however with play-off for qualifiers;

=== Play-off for promotion ===
The decider match for second place was played on 19 June 1955 at the Landhof in Basel.

Team 1	Score	Team 2
Schaffhausen	2–1	Biel-Bienne

Schaffhausen won and achieved promotion to 1955–56 Nationalliga A. Biel-Bienne remain in the division for the next season.

=== Play-out against relegation ===
The decider match against relegation was played on 19 June at the Stadion Allmend in Luzern.

Team 1	Score	Team 2
Bern	2–1	Locarno

Bern won and remained in division for the next season. Locarno were relegated to 1955–56 1. Liga.

== Further in Swiss football ==
- 1954–55 Swiss Cup
- 1954–55 Swiss 1. Liga

== Sources ==
- Switzerland 1954–55 at RSSSF

Preceded by 1953–54	Nationalliga seasons in Switzerland	Succeeded by 1955–56
