= 1953–54 Nationalliga A =

Swiss football season

Nationalliga A
- Season: 1953–54
- Champions: La Chaux-de-Fonds
- Relegated: FC Bern; Biel-Bienne
- Top goalscorer: Josef Hügi (Basel); 29 goals

Nationalliga B
- Season: 1953–54
- Champions: Lugano
- Promoted: Lugano; Thun
- Relegated: Wil; Aarau
- Top goalscorer: Kurt Scheller (Winterthur); 17 goals

The following is the summary of the Swiss National League in the 1953–54 football season, both Nationalliga A and Nationalliga B. This was the 57th season of top-tier and the 56th season of second-tier football in Switzerland.

== Overview ==
The Swiss Football Association (ASF/SFV) had 28 member clubs at this time which were divided into two divisions of 14 teams each. The teams played a double round-robin to decide their table positions. Two points were awarded for a win and one point was awarded for a draw. The top tier (NLA) was contested by the top 12 teams from the previous season and the two newly promoted teams Luzern and Biel-Bienne. The last two teams in the league table at the end of the season were to be relegated.

The second-tier (NLB) was contested by the two teams that had been relegated from the NLA at the end of the last season, these were Lugano and Locarno, the ten teams that had been in third to twelfth position last season and the two newly promoted teams Thun and Yverdon-Sport. The top two teams at the end of the season would be promoted to the 1954–55 NLA and the two last placed teams would be relegated to the 1954–55 Swiss 1. Liga.

== Nationalliga A ==
=== Teams, locations ===
Team	Based in	Canton	Stadium	Capacity
FC Basel	Basel	Basel-Stadt	Landhof	4,000
AC Bellinzona	Bellinzona	Ticino	Stadio Comunale Bellinzona	5,000
FC Bern	Bern	Bern	Stadion Neufeld	14,000
FC Biel-Bienne	Biel/Bienne	Bern	Stadion Gurzelen	5,500
FC Chiasso	Chiasso	Ticino	Stadio Comunale Riva IV	4,000
Grasshopper Club Zürich	Zürich	Zürich	Hardturm	20,000
FC Fribourg	Fribourg	Fribourg	Stade Universitaire	9,000
FC Grenchen	Grenchen	Solothurn	Stadium Brühl	10,900
FC La Chaux-de-Fonds	La Chaux-de-Fonds	Neuchâtel	Centre Sportif de la Charrière	10,000
FC Lausanne-Sport	Lausanne	Vaud	Pontaise	30,000
FC Luzern	Lucerne	Lucerne	Stadion Allmend	25,000
Servette FC	Geneva	Geneva	Stade des Charmilles	27,000
BSC Young Boys	Bern	Bern	Wankdorf Stadium	56,000
FC Zürich	Zürich	Zürich	Letzigrund	25,000

=== Final league table ===
Pos	Team	Pld	W	D	L	GF	GA	GD	Pts	Qualification
1	La Chaux-de-Fonds	26	20	2	4	78	36	+42	42	Swiss Champions and Swiss Cup winners
2	Grasshopper Club	26	19	3	4	108	47	+61	41	
3	Lausanne-Sport	26	15	6	5	69	46	+23	36	
4	Young Boys	26	13	4	9	66	44	+22	30	
5	Servette	26	10	10	6	55	38	+17	30	
6	Bellinzona	26	10	5	11	41	44	−3	25	
7	Grenchen	26	10	4	12	53	58	−5	24	
8	Basel	26	11	2	13	55	62	−7	24	
9	Chiasso	26	9	5	12	45	62	−17	23	
10	Luzern	26	10	2	14	47	68	−21	22	
11	Zürich	26	8	4	14	45	64	−19	20	
12	Fribourg	26	8	2	16	37	53	−16	18	
13	FC Bern	26	8	1	17	40	75	−35	17	Relegated to 1954–55 Nationalliga B
14	Biel-Bienne	26	5	2	19	36	78	−42	12	Relegated to 1954–55 Nationalliga B

Source: RSSSF
Rules for classification: 1) Points; 2) Goal difference within the league, however with play-off for qualifiers;

=== Results ===
Home \ Away	BAS	BEL	BER	BB	CDF	CHI	FRI	GCZ	GRE	LS	LUZ	SER	YB	ZÜR
Basel		3–2	3–1	4–0	4–2	1–3	3–2	1–6	4–3	2–3	1–2	2–3	1–0	3–4
Bellinzona	2–0		1–2	2–0	0–2	4–1	1–0	1–2	2–1	2–3	3–0	1–1	2–0	2–0
Bern	2–2	3–0		2–1	1–4	5–1	2–1	1–5	3–6	3–5	5–2	0–5	0–4	1–0
Biel-Bienne	2–1	1–1	3–0		1–5	3–4	2–0	0–5	2–4	0–3	5–2	1–4	2–4	2–2
La Chaux-de-Fonds	2–0	4–2	5–0	5–0		5–1	4–1	1–1	2–1	4–3	4–1	1–0	3–1	4–2
Chiasso	3–5	4–1	2–1	5–2	3–3		1–0	0–0	0–1	4–0	1–2	0–3	1–5	1–2
Fribourg	2–1	2–0	4–1	3–2	0–2	1–2		1–4	1–0	3–3	1–2	3–1	2–0	1–0
Grasshopper Club	3–4	6–0	4–2	4–2	4–2	7–2	3–0		8–3	1–1	9–1	7–4	3–2	6–0
Grenchen	2–1	1–1	4–1	1–2	2–4	2–2	2–0	2–6		2–2	3–1	0–0	1–4	3–1
Lausanne-Sports	5–2	1–1	3–0	3–1	3–4	2–1	2–1	3–1	1–0		4–0	2–2	6–1	2–5
Luzern	2–3	1–2	3–1	3–0	1–2	0–0	3–2	2–1	1–3	4–7		2–2	4–0	5–1
Servette	2–2	3–2	4–0	2–0	0–1	1–2	3–3	3–4	3–1	0–0	0–0		0–0	4–0
Young Boys	3–0	3–3	2–1	3–1	0–2	5–0	5–0	7–4	3–4	2–0	3–0	2–2		5–0
Zürich	1–2	0–3	1–2	6–1	2–1	1–1	4–3	2–4	3–1	0–2	5–2	1–1	2–2	

Source: RSSSF
Legend: Blue = home team win; Yellow = draw; Red = away team win.

=== Topscorers ===
Rank	Player	Nat.	Goals	Club
1.	Josef Hügi	(Switzerland)	29	Basel
2.	Branislav Vukosavljević	(Socialist Federal Republic of Yugoslavia)	28	Grasshopper Club
3.	Roger Vonlanthen	(Switzerland)	23	Grasshopper Club
4.	Eugen Meier	(Switzerland)	22	Young Boys
5.	Charles Antenen	(Switzerland)	17	La Chaux-de-Fonds
5.	Hans Hagen	(Switzerland)	17	Grasshopper Club
7.	Robert Ballaman	(Switzerland)	16	Grasshopper Club
8.	Res Kyd	(Switzerland)	15	Luzern
9.	Jacques Fatton	(Switzerland)	14	Servette
9.	Ferdinando Riva	(Switzerland)	14	Chiasso

== Nationalliga B ==
=== Teams, locations ===
Team	Based in	Canton	Stadium	Capacity
FC Aarau	Aarau	Aargau	Stadion Brügglifeld	9,240
FC Cantonal Neuchâtel	Neuchâtel	Neuchâtel	Stade de la Maladière	25,500
FC Locarno	Locarno	Ticino	Stadio comunale Lido	5,000
FC Lugano	Lugano	Ticino	Cornaredo Stadium	6,330
ES FC Malley	Malley	Vaud	Centre sportif de la Tuilière	1,500
FC Schaffhausen	Schaffhausen	Schaffhausen	Stadion Breite	7,300
FC Solothurn	Solothurn	Solothurn	Stadion FC Solothurn	6,750
FC St. Gallen	St. Gallen	St. Gallen	Espenmoos	11,000
FC Thun	Thun	Bern	Stadion Lachen	10,350
Urania Genève Sport	Genève	Geneva	Stade de Frontenex	4,000
FC Wil	Wil	St. Gallen	Sportpark Bergholz	6,048
FC Winterthur	Winterthur	Zürich	Schützenwiese	8,550
FC Young Fellows	Zürich	Zürich	Utogrund	2,850
Yverdon-Sport FC	Yverdon-les-Bains	Vaud	Stade Municipal	6,600

=== Final league table ===
Pos	Team	Pld	W	D	L	GF	GA	GD	Pts	Qualification
1	FC Lugano	26	16	4	6	55	38	+17	36	To play-off for NLB championship
2	FC Thun	26	16	4	6	60	34	+26	36	To play-off for NLB championship
3	ES FC Malley	26	13	8	5	59	38	+21	34	
4	FC Cantonal Neuchâtel	26	13	5	8	60	39	+21	31	
5	Young Fellows Zürich	26	13	4	9	59	47	+12	30	
6	FC Schaffhausen	26	9	10	7	50	42	+8	28	
7	Yverdon-Sport FC	26	11	5	10	38	39	−1	27	
8	FC St. Gallen	26	8	7	11	44	51	−7	23	
9	FC Solothurn	26	9	5	12	41	50	−9	23	
10	FC Locarno	26	9	4	13	39	55	−16	22	
11	FC Winterthur	26	8	5	13	56	57	−1	21	
12	Urania Genève Sport	26	7	6	13	31	47	−16	20	
13	FC Wil	26	7	3	16	32	62	−30	17	Relegated to 1954–55 1. Liga
14	FC Aarau	26	5	6	15	27	52	−25	16	Relegated to 1954–55 1. Liga

Source: RSSSF
Rules for classification: 1) Points; 2) Goal difference within the league, however with play-off for qualifiers;

=== Decider for NLB championship ===
Lugano and FC Thun finished the season level on points in joint first position and both achieved promotion to 1954–55 Nationalliga A. However, it required a play-out to decide the division championship. The play-off was played on 16 May 1954 in the Stadion Allmend in Luzern.

Team 1	Score	Team 2
Lugano	3–2	FC Thun

Lugano won and were NLB champions.

== Further in Swiss football ==
- 1953–54 Swiss Cup
- 1953–54 Swiss 1. Liga

== Sources ==
- Switzerland 1953–54 at RSSSF

Preceded by 1952–53	Nationalliga seasons in Switzerland	Succeeded by 1954–55
