= 1955–56 Swiss Cup =

Tournament details
- Country: Switzerland

Final positions
- Champions: Grasshopper Club
- Runners-up: Young Boys

The 1955–56 Swiss Cup was the 31st season of Switzerland's football cup competition, organised annually since 1925–26 by the Swiss Football Association.

== Overview ==
This season's cup competition began with the games of the first round, played on the week-end of the 25 September 1955. The competition was to be completed on Whit Monday, 21 May 1956, with the final, which was traditionally held at the former Wankdorf Stadium in Bern. The clubs from the 1955–56 Swiss 1. Liga were given a bye for the first round, they joined the competition in the second round on the week-end of 16 October. The clubs from this season's Nationalliga A (NLA) and from this season's Nationalliga B (NLB) were given byes for the first two rounds. These teams joined the competition in the third round, which was played on the week-end of 20 November.

The matches were played in a knockout format. In the event of a draw after 90 minutes, the match went into extra time. In the event of a draw at the end of extra time, a replay was foreseen and this was played on the visiting team's pitch. If the replay ended in a draw after extra time, a toss of a coin would establish the team that qualified for the next round.

== Round 1 ==
In the first phase, the lower league teams that had qualified themselves for the competition through their regional football association's regional cup competitions or their association's requirements, competed here. Whenever possible, the draw respected local regionalities. The first round was played on the weekend of 25 September 1955.

=== Summary ===
==== Region Ostschweiz ====
Team 1	Score	Team 2
25 September 1955
Svgg Schaffhausen	3–4	FC Weinfelden
FC Amriswil	5–1	FC Bischofszell
Arbon	3–2	FC Widnau
FC Uznach	5–1	Chur

==== Region Zürich ====
Team 1	Score	Team 2
25 September 1955
FC Stäfa (ZH)	3–1	FC Küsnacht (ZH)
FC Industrie	1–3	FC Wiedikon
FC Ticinese Zürich	2–7	FC Horgen
FC Wollishofen	2–1	Juventus Zürich
FC Tössfeld (Winterthur)	7–3	SC Veltheim
SV Seebach	5–2	FC Neuhausen

==== Region Bern ====
Team 1	Score	Team 2
25 September 1955
FC Tramelan	4–3	FC Bözingen 34
FC Grünstern (Ipsach)	2–4	FC Länggasse (Bern)
Bümpliz	1–1 (a.e.t.)	FC Interlaken
FC Herzogenbuchsee	3–2	FC Kirchberg (BE)

Replay

Team 1	Score	Team 2
2 October 1955
FC Interlaken	0–2	Bümpliz

==== Region Solothurn ====
Team 1	Score	Team 2
25 September 1955
FC Gerlafingen	3–1	FC Klus-Balsthal
SC Derendingen	1–0	FC Blustavia (Solothurn)

==== Region Nordwestschweiz ====
Team 1	Score	Team 2
25 September 1955
Muttenz	1–4	Zofingen
SV Sissach	0–0 (a.e.t.)	Binningen
Dornach	4–3	Old Boys

Replay

Team 1	Score	Team 2
2 October 1955
Binningen	5–0	SV Sissach

==== Region Aargau ====
Team 1	Score	Team 2
25 September 1955
FC Kölliken	1–2	FC Muhen
FC Turgi	0–1	Wohlen

==== Region Innerschweiz ====
Team 1	Score	Team 2
25 September 1955
Emmenbrücke	4–0	Luzerner SC
FC Altdorf (Uri)	5–1	Cham

==== Region Ticino ====
Team 1	Score	Team 2
25 September 1955
AS Lamone-Cadempino	1–5	FC Solduno

==== Region Romande ====
Team 1	Score	Team 2
25 September 1955
FC Geneva (GE)	3–4	FC Versoix
Chênois	1–2	CA Genève (GE)
FC Crissier	2–9	FC Renens
FC Vallorbe	3–2	Beaumont Lausanne
FC Lutry	1–2	FC Chailly/Lausanne
FC Saint-Maurice	2–1	FC Visp
FC Domdidier	1–1 (a.e.t.)	FC Estavayer-le-Lac
FC Flamatt	1–5	Central Fribourg
FC Hauterive	1–2	FC Fleurier
Le Locle-Sports	1–4	Étoile-Sporting
FC Coutetelle	1–2	Alle

Replay

Team 1	Score	Team 2
2 October 1955
FC Estavayer-le-Lac	1–4	FC Domdidier

== Round 2 ==
The clubs from the 1955–56 Swiss 1. Liga had been given a bye for the first round, they now joined the competition here, in the second round.

=== Summary ===
Team 1	Score	Team 2
16 October 1955
FC Weinfelden	0–3	FC Wil
Red Star	2–2 (a.e.t.)	FC Amriswil
Arbon	3–2	FC Rorschach
FC Uznach	2–3	Brühl
FC Stäfa (ZH)	1–2 (a.e.t.)	Aarau
FC Wiedikon	6–1	FC Oerlikon (ZH)
FC Horgen	2–1 (a.e.t.)	Baden
FC Wollishofen	4–2 (a.e.t.)	SC Zug
FC Tössfeld	1–3	Bodio
Polizei Zürich	5–1	SV Seebach
FC Tramelan	0–4	Yverdon-Sport
FC Länggasse (Bern)	1–1 (a.e.t.) * 3–0 Forfeit	US Lausanne
FC Interlaken	1–3 (a.e.t.)	FC Sierre
FC Herzogenbuchsee	3–5	Burgdorf
FC Gerlafingen	1–2	US Bienne-Boujean
SC Derendingen	4–2	FC Helvetia Bern
Zofingen	1–2	FC Birsfelden
Binningen	1–0	FC Bassecourt
Dornach	5–3	SC Kleinhüningen
Concordia	7–1	FC Muhen
FC Olten	4–1	Wohlen
Emmenbrücke	4–0	Mendrisio
Locarno	3–1	FC Altdorf (Uri)
FC Solduno	3–1	US Pro Daro
FC Versoix	4–6	Sion
CA Genève	3–3 (a.e.t.)	Martigny-Sports
FC Renens	0–2	Montreux-Sports
FC Vallorbe	2–3	CS International Genève
Vevey Sports	5–2	FC Chailly/Lausanne
FC Saint-Maurice	2–0	CS La Tour-de-Peilz
FC Forward Morges	6–2	FC Domdidier
Central Fribourg	5–1	Monthey
FC Fleurier	3–4	Moutier
Étoile-Sporting	0–3	Saint-Imier-Sports
Alle	0–3 (a.e.t.)	Delémont
FC Riehen	2–5	FC Porrentruy

- Note: Match Länggasse–US Lausanne awarded 3–0 Forfeit because the player Oskar Porredos of US Lausanne was not qualified.

Replays

Team 1	Score	Team 2
6 November 1955
FC Amriswil	1–0	Red Star
Martigny-Sports	3–0	CA Genève

=== Matches ===
16 October 1955

FC Stäfa (ZH)	1–2 (a.e.t.)	Aarau
Goal	FCA summary	Goal

Sportanlage Frohberg, Stäfa

== Round 3 ==
The teams from the NLA and NLB entered the cup competition in this round. However, the teams from the NLA were seeded and could not be drawn against each other. Whenever possible, the draw respected local regionalities. The third round was played on the week-end of 19 and 20 November 1956.

=== Summary ===
Team 1	Score	Team 2
19 November 1956
Binningen	0–5	Basel
19 or 20 November 1956
La Chaux-de-Fonds	2–1 (a.e.t.)	Vevey Sports
Fribourg	6–1	Martigny-Sports
SC Derendingen	1–2	Grenchen
FC Porrentruy	4–3 (a.e.t.)	Dornach
Lausanne-Sport	6–0	Central Fribourg
Cantonal Neuchâtel	6–1	FC Saint-Maurice
ES Malley	1–2	Yverdon-Sport
Bern	4–1	Moutier
FC Forward Morges	0–3 (a.e.t.)	Urania Genève Sport
FC Olten	1–2	Emmenbrücke
Biel-Bienne	7–1	FC Birsfelden
Nordstern	5–1	Saint-Imier-Sports
Locarno	2–1	Chiasso
Young Fellows	3–0	FC Wiedikon
Brühl	2–2 (a.e.t.)	FC Horgen
Bellinzona	9–1	FC Sierre
Delémont	5–3 (a.e.t.)	Lengnau
Luzern	3–0	Burgdorf
FC Länggasse (Bern)	0–2 (a.e.t.)	Solothurn
Concordia	3–0	Thun
Bodio	0–2	Lugano
Arbon	0–7	Grasshopper Club
Schaffhausen	2–0	FC Amriswil
FC Wil	0–2	Winterthur
St. Gallen	1–2	Polizei Zürich
Blue Stars	3–0	FC Wollishofen
FC Solduno	3–1	FC Rapid Lugano
CS International Genève	1–1 (a.e.t.)	Montreux-Sports
Young Boys	5–0	US Bienne-Boujean
20 November 1956
Servette	2–0	Sion
Aarau	1–0	Zürich

Replays

Team 1	Score	Team 2
11 December 1956
FC Horgen	2–4	Brühl
Montreux-Sports	2–4	CS International Genève

=== Matches ===
19 November 1955

SC Binningen	0–5	Basel
	FCB summary	23' (0:1) Keller; 27' (pen. 0:2) Thüler; 58' (0:3) Sanmann; 72' (0:4) Keller; 82' (pen. 0:5)

Landhof, Basel
Attendance: 1,000
Referee: (Switzerland) Fritz Schorer (Interlaken)
- Note: SC Binningen waived the home ground advantage and played in the Landhof.

20 November 1956

Servette	2–0	Sion
Pasteur (1:0); Pasteur (2:0)	Servette summary

Stade des Charmilles, Geneva

20 November 1956

Aarau	1–0	Zürich
Lüscher 20' (1:0)	FCA summary FCZ summary

Stadion Brügglifeld, Aarau
Attendance: 4,200
Referee: (Switzerland) Fritz Zutter (Bern)

== Round 4 ==
=== Summary ===
Team 1	Score	Team 2
18 December 1955
La Chaux-de-Fonds	1–2	Fribourg
Grenchen	3–1 (a.e.t.)	FC Porrentruy
Lausanne-Sport	2–5	Cantonal Neuchâtel
Yverdon-Sport	2–5	Servette
Bern	0–1	Urania Genève Sport
Basel	6–2	Emmenbrücke
Biel-Bienne	4–2 (a.e.t.)	Nordstern
Locarno	2–1	Young Fellows
Brühl	1–2	Bellinzona
Delémont	4–1	Luzern
Solothurn	0–1	Concordia
Aarau	1–2	Lugano
Grasshopper Club	5–3	Schaffhausen
Winterthur	5–4	Polizei Zürich
Blue Stars	9–0	FC Solduno
CS International Genève	0–6	Young Boys

=== Matches ===
18 December 1955

Yverdon-Sport	2–5	Servette
Goal	Servette summary	2x Anker; 1x Bernard Coutaz; 1x Théo Brinek; 1x Rothacher

Stade Municipal, Yverdon-les-Bains

18 December 1955
14:30

Basel	6 – 2	FC Emmenbrücke
Oberer (1:2); Hügi (II) 31' (2:2); Hügi (II) 63' (3:2); Stäuble 64' (4:2); Bielser 83' (5:2); Hügi (II) 80' (6:2)	FCB summary	(0:1) Kehl; 23' (0:2) Steffen

Landhof, Basel
Attendance: 2,300
Referee: (Switzerland) W. Weiersmüller (Suhr)

18 December 1955

Aarau	1–2	Lugano
Goal	FCA summary	Goal

Stadion Brügglifeld, Aarau
Attendance: 5,300

== Round 5 ==
=== Summary ===
Team 1	Score	Team 2
19 February 1956
Fribourg	0–1 (a.e.t.)	Grasshopper Club
Grenchen	1–0	Winterthur
Cantonal Neuchâtel	5–1	Blue Stars
Servette	0–1	Young Boys
Urania Genève Sport	3–1	Lugano
Basel	7–3	Biel-Bienne
Locarno	0–1	Bellinzona
Delémont	2–3	Concordia

=== Matches ===
19 February 1956

Servette	0–1	Young Boys
	Servette summary	Goal

Stade des Charmilles, Geneva

19 February 1956
14:30

Basel	7 – 3	Biel-Bienne
Stäuble 2' (1:0); Stäuble 38' (2:3); Thüler (pen. 3:3); Sanmann 48' (4:3); Hügi (II) 70' (5:3); Sanmann 74' (6:3); Stäuble 80' (7:3)	FCB summary	18' (1:1) Kohler; 23' (1:2) Riederer; 33' (1:3) Allemann

Landhof, Basel
Attendance: 1,500
Referee: (Switzerland) Joseph Surdez (Delémont)

== Quarter-finals ==
=== Summary ===
Team 1	Score	Team 2
2 April 1956
Grenchen	5–0	Concordia
Grasshopper Club	2–0	Bellinzona
Cantonal Neuchâtel	1–0	Basel
Young Boys	2–0	Urania Genève Sport

=== Matches ===
2 April 1956
15:00

Cantonal Neuchatel	1–0	Basel
Lanz 85' (1:0)	FCB summary

Stade de la Maladière (1924), Neuchâtel
Attendance: 6,000
Referee: (Switzerland) Fritz Buchmüller (Zürich)

== Semi-finals ==
=== Summary ===
Team 1	Score	Team 2
22 April 1956
Grenchen	0–4	Grasshopper Club
Cantonal Neuchâtel	0–1	Young Boys

=== Matches ===
22 April 1956

Grenchen	0–4	Grasshopper Club
	RSSSF summary	Vukosavljević 19' (0:1); Vukosavljević 26' (0:2); Moser 65' (0:3); Vukosavljević 82' (0:4)

Stadium Brühl, Grenchen

22 April 1956

Cantonal Neuchâtel	0–1	Young Boys
	RSSSF summary	16' (0:1) Scheller

== Final ==
The final was held at the former Wankdorf Stadium in Bern on Whit Monday 1956.

=== Summary ===
Team 1	Score	Team 2
21 May 1956
Grasshopper Club	1–0	Young Boys

=== Telegram ===
21 May 1956

Grasshopper Club	1–0	Young Boys
Vukosavljević 84' (1:0)	Fussball-Schweiz summary

Wankdorf Stadium, Bern
Attendance: 50,000
Referee: (Switzerland) Gottfried Dienst (Basel)

Grasshopper Club won the cup and this was the club's thirteenth cup title to this date.

== Further in Swiss football ==
- 1955–56 Nationalliga A
- 1955–56 Swiss 1. Liga

== Sources ==
- Fussball-Schweiz
- FCB Cup games 1955–56 at fcb-achiv.ch
- Switzerland 1955–56 at RSSSF

Preceded by 1954–55	Swiss Cup seasons	Succeeded by 1956–57
