= 1953–54 Swiss 1. Liga =

1. Liga
- Season: 1953–54
- Champions: 1. Liga champions: Blue Stars; Group West: Bienne-Boujean; Group Cenral: Nordstern; Group South and East: Blue Stars
- Promoted: Blue Stars; Nordstern
- Relegated: Group West: Étoile-Sporting; Group Central: SC Derendingen; Group South and East: SC Schöftland; FC Arbon
- Matches: 3 times 132 plus 3 play-offs and 3 play-outs

The 1953–54 1. Liga season was the 22nd season of the 1. Liga since its creation in 1931. At this time, the 1. Liga was the third-tier of the Swiss football league system and it was the highest level of totally amateur football, because at this time, the clubs in the two higher divisions in Switzerland were starting to employ semi-professional and even professional players.

== Format ==
There were 36 teams competing in the 1. Liga this season. They were divided into three regional groups, each group with 12 teams. Within each group, the teams would play a double round-robin to decide their league position. Two points were awarded for a win and one point was awarded for a draw. The three group winners then contested a play-off round to decide the two promotion slots. The last placed team in each group were directly relegated to the 2. Liga (fourth tier). The three second last placed teams were to contest a play-out to decide the fourth relegation slot.

== Group West ==
=== Teams, locations ===
| Club | Based in | Canton | Stadium | Capacity |
|---|---|---|---|---|
| US Bienne-Boujean | Biel/Bienne | Bern | | |
| FC Central Fribourg | Fribourg | Fribourg | Guintzet | 2,000 |
| FC Étoile-Sporting | La Chaux-de-Fonds | Neuchâtel | Les Foulets / Terrain des Eplatures | 1,000 / 500 |
| CS La Tour-de-Peilz | La Tour-de-Peilz | Vaud | Stade de Bel-Air | 1,000 |
| US Lausanne | Lausanne | Vaud | | |
| FC Martigny-Sports | Martigny | Valais | Stade d'Octodure | 2,500 |
| FC Monthey | Monthey | Valais | Stade Philippe Pottier | 1,800 |
| FC Montreux-Sports | Montreux | Vaud | Stade de Chailly | 1,000 |
| FC Forward Morges | Morges | Vaud | Parc des Sports | 600 |
| FC Sierre | Sierre | Valais | Complexe Ecossia | 2,000 |
| FC Sion | Sion | Valais | Parc des sports (Tourbillon) | 8,000 |
| Vevey Sports | Vevey | Vaud | Stade de Copet | 4,000 |

=== Final league table ===
| Pos | Team | Pld | W | D | L | GF | GA | GD | Pts | Qualification or relegation |
|---|---|---|---|---|---|---|---|---|---|---|
| 1 | US Bienne-Boujean | 22 | 15 | 4 | 3 | 84 | 37 | +47 | 34 | To promotion play-off |
| 2 | FC Martigny-Sports | 22 | 12 | 5 | 5 | 52 | 36 | +16 | 29 | |
| 3 | Vevey Sports | 22 | 10 | 7 | 5 | 38 | 23 | +15 | 27 | |
| 4 | CS La Tour-de-Peilz | 22 | 11 | 5 | 6 | 46 | 40 | +6 | 27 | |
| 5 | FC Sion | 22 | 11 | 4 | 7 | 57 | 43 | +14 | 26 | |
| 6 | FC Sierre | 22 | 8 | 6 | 8 | 48 | 42 | +6 | 22 | |
| 7 | FC Montreux-Sports | 22 | 9 | 4 | 9 | 45 | 47 | −2 | 22 | |
| 8 | US Lausanne | 22 | 8 | 4 | 10 | 57 | 60 | −3 | 20 | |
| 9 | FC Forward Morges | 22 | 6 | 6 | 10 | 41 | 47 | −6 | 18 | |
| 10 | FC Monthey | 22 | 6 | 6 | 10 | 51 | 62 | −11 | 18 | |
| 11 | Central Fribourg | 22 | 5 | 3 | 14 | 32 | 70 | −38 | 13 | Play-out against relegation |
| 12 | FC Étoile-Sporting | 22 | 3 | 2 | 17 | 32 | 76 | −44 | 8 | Relegation to 2. Liga |

Source: RSSSF
Rules for classification: 1) Points; 2) Goal difference within the league, but decider play-off for qualifiers.

== Group Central ==
=== Teams, locations ===
| Club | Based in | Canton | Stadium | Capacity |
|---|---|---|---|---|
| SC Burgdorf | Burgdorf | Bern | Stadion Neumatt | 3,850 |
| FC Concordia Basel | Basel | Basel-Stadt | Stadion Rankhof | 7,000 |
| SR Delémont | Delémont | Jura | La Blancherie | 5,263 |
| SC Derendingen | Derendingen | Solothurn | Heidenegg | 1,500 |
| FC Helvetia Bern | Bern | Bern | Spitalacker, Bern | 1,000 |
| SC Kleinhüningen | Basel | Basel-Stadt | Sportplatz Schorenmatte | 300 |
| FC Lengnau | Lengnau | Bern | Moos Lengnau BE | 3,900 |
| FC Moutier | Moutier | Bern | Stade de Chalière | 5,000 |
| FC Nordstern Basel | Basel | Basel-Stadt | Rankhof | 7,600 |
| FC Olten | Olten | Solothurn | Sportanlagen Kleinholz | 8,000 |
| FC Porrentruy | Porrentruy | Jura | Stade du Tirage | 4,226 |
| Saint-Imier-Sports | Saint-Imier | Bern | Terrain de Fin-des-Fourches | 1,000 |

=== Final league table ===
| Pos | Team | Pld | W | D | L | GF | GA | GD | Pts | Qualification or relegation |
|---|---|---|---|---|---|---|---|---|---|---|
| 1 | FC Nordstern Basel | 22 | 15 | 6 | 1 | 62 | 22 | +40 | 36 | To promotion play-off |
| 2 | FC Porrentruy | 22 | 13 | 5 | 4 | 56 | 30 | +26 | 31 | |
| 3 | FC Lengnau | 22 | 12 | 3 | 7 | 42 | 36 | +6 | 27 | |
| 4 | FC Concordia Basel | 22 | 10 | 4 | 8 | 46 | 33 | +13 | 24 | |
| 5 | SC Burgdorf | 22 | 10 | 3 | 9 | 51 | 52 | −1 | 23 | |
| 6 | FC Moutier | 22 | 7 | 8 | 7 | 24 | 32 | −8 | 22 | |
| 7 | FC Olten | 22 | 8 | 3 | 11 | 49 | 52 | −3 | 19 | |
| 8 | SC Kleinhüningen | 22 | 7 | 5 | 10 | 46 | 50 | −4 | 19 | |
| 9 | FC Helvetia Bern | 22 | 5 | 8 | 9 | 35 | 35 | 0 | 18 | |
| 10 | SR Delémont | 22 | 6 | 6 | 10 | 45 | 54 | −9 | 18 | |
| 11 | Saint-Imier-Sports | 22 | 7 | 3 | 12 | 35 | 56 | −21 | 17 | Play-out against relegation |
| 12 | SC Derendingen | 22 | 4 | 2 | 16 | 23 | 62 | −39 | 10 | Relegation to 2. Liga |

Source: RSSSF
Rules for classification: 1) Points; 2) Goal difference within the league, but decider play-off for qualifiers.

== Group South and East ==
=== Teams, locations ===
| Club | Based in | Canton | Stadium | Capacity |
|---|---|---|---|---|
| FC Arbon | Arbon | Thurgau | Stacherholz | 1,000 |
| FC Baden | Baden | Aargau | Esp Stadium | 7,000 |
| FC Blue Stars Zürich | Zürich | Zürich | Hardhof | 1,000 |
| FC Bodio | Bodio | Ticino | Campo comunale Pollegio | 1,000 |
| SC Brühl | St. Gallen | St. Gallen | Paul-Grüninger-Stadion | 4,200 |
| FC Küsnacht | Küsnacht | Zürich | Sportanlage Heslibach | 2,300 |
| FC Mendrisio | Mendrisio | Ticino | Centro Sportivo Comunale | 4,000 |
| FC Oerlikon | Oerlikon (Zürich) | Zürich | Sportanlage Neudorf | 1,000 |
| US Pro Daro | Bellinzona | Ticino | Campo Geretta / Stadio Comunale Bellinzona | 500 / 5,000 |
| FC Red Star Zürich | Zürich | Zürich | Allmend Brunau | 2,000 |
| SC Schöftland | Schöftland | Aargau | Sportanlage Rütimatten | 2,000 |
| SC Zug | Zug | Zug | Herti Allmend Stadion | 6,000 |

=== Final league table ===
| Pos | Team | Pld | W | D | L | GF | GA | GD | Pts | Qualification or relegation |
|---|---|---|---|---|---|---|---|---|---|---|
| 1 | FC Blue Stars Zürich | 22 | 16 | 3 | 3 | 71 | 32 | +39 | 35 | To promotion play-off |
| 2 | FC Baden | 22 | 9 | 8 | 5 | 36 | 28 | +8 | 26 | |
| 3 | FC Oerlikon | 22 | 10 | 6 | 6 | 42 | 40 | +2 | 26 | |
| 4 | SC Zug | 22 | 10 | 5 | 7 | 33 | 30 | +3 | 25 | |
| 5 | FC Red Star Zürich | 22 | 8 | 7 | 7 | 38 | 34 | +4 | 23 | |
| 6 | FC Küsnacht | 22 | 6 | 10 | 6 | 48 | 39 | +9 | 22 | |
| 7 | FC Bodio | 22 | 8 | 4 | 10 | 39 | 40 | −1 | 20 | |
| 8 | US Pro Daro | 22 | 7 | 6 | 9 | 31 | 40 | −9 | 20 | |
| 9 | SC Brühl | 22 | 6 | 7 | 9 | 28 | 39 | −11 | 19 | |
| 10 | FC Mendrisio | 22 | 4 | 9 | 9 | 28 | 52 | −24 | 17 | |
| 11 | SC Schöftland | 22 | 4 | 8 | 10 | 36 | 48 | −12 | 16 | Play-out against relegation |
| 12 | FC Arbon | 22 | 5 | 5 | 12 | 43 | 51 | −8 | 15 | Relegation to 2. Liga |

Source: RSSSF
Rules for classification: 1) Points; 2) Goal difference within the league, but decider play-off for qualifiers.

== Promotion, relegation ==
=== Promotion play-off ===
The three group winners played a single round-robin to decide the two promotion slots. The promotion play-offs were held 6, 13 and 20 June 1954.

| Pos | Team | Pld | W | D | L | GF | GA | GD | Pts | Qualification | BSZ | NOR | BBB |
|---|---|---|---|---|---|---|---|---|---|---|---|---|---|
| 1 | Blue Stars | 2 | 2 | 0 | 0 | 9 | 4 | +5 | 4 | Champions and promoted | — | — | 6–2 |
| 2 | Nordstern | 2 | 1 | 0 | 1 | 5 | 5 | 0 | 2 | Promoted | 2–3 | — | — |
| 3 | US Bienne-Boujean | 2 | 0 | 0 | 2 | 4 | 9 | −5 | 0 | | — | 2–3 | — |

Source: RSSSF
Rules for classification: 1) Points; 2) Head-to-head 3) Decider.

Blue Stars are 1. Liga Champions and together with runners-up Nordstern were promoted to 1954–55 Nationalliga B. US Bienne-Boujean remained in the division.

=== Relegation play-out ===
The three second last placed teams from each group contested a play-out to decide the fourth and final relegation slot. The matches in the play-outs were held on 13, 20 and 27 June 1954.

| Pos | Team | Pld | W | D | L | GF | GA | GD | Pts | Relegation | CEN | SIS | SFT |
|---|---|---|---|---|---|---|---|---|---|---|---|---|---|
| 1 | Central Fribourg | 2 | 1 | 1 | 0 | 5 | 2 | +3 | 3 | | — | 3–0 | — |
| 2 | Saint-Imier-Sports | 2 | 1 | 0 | 1 | 3 | 5 | −2 | 2 | | — | — | 3–2 |
| 3 | SC Schöftland | 2 | 0 | 1 | 1 | 4 | 5 | −1 | 1 | Relegated to 2. Liga | 2–2 | — | — |

Source: RSSSF
Rules for classification: 1) Points; 2) Head-to-head 3) Decider.

Central Fribourg and Saint-Imier-Sports remained in the division, SC Schöftland were relegated to 2. Liga.

== Further in Swiss football ==
- 1953–54 Nationalliga A
- 1953–54 Nationalliga B
- 1953–54 Swiss Cup

== Sources ==
- Switzerland 1953–54 at RSSSF

| Preceded by 1952–53 | Seasons in Swiss 1. Liga | Succeeded by 1954–55 |
