= 1955–56 Nationalliga A =

Swiss football season

Nationalliga A
- Season: 1955–56
- Champions: Grasshopper Club
- Relegated: Grenchen; Fribourg
- Top goalscorer: Branislav Vukosavljević (GC); 33 goals

Nationalliga B
- Season: 1955–56
- Champions: Winterthur
- Promoted: Winterthur; Young Fellows
- Relegated: Blue Stars; Rapid Lugano
- Top goalscorer: Walter Beerli (Luzern); Günter Sosna both 22 goals

The following is the summary of the Swiss National League in the 1955–56 football season, both Nationalliga A and Nationalliga B. This was the 59th season of top-tier and the 58th season of second-tier football in Switzerland.

== Overview ==
The Swiss Football Association (ASF/SFV) had 28 member clubs at this time which were divided into two divisions of 14 teams each. The teams played a double round-robin to decide their table positions. Two points were awarded for a win and one point was awarded for a draw. The top tier (NLA) was contested by the top 12 teams from the previous 1954–55 season and the two newly promoted teams Urania Genève Sport and FC Schaffhausen. The champions would qualify for the 1956–57 European Cup and the last two teams in the league table at the end of the season were to be relegated.

The second-tier (NLB) was contested by the two teams that had been relegated from the NLA at the end of the last season, these were FC Thun and FC Luzern, the ten teams that had been in third to twelfth position last season and the two newly promoted teams FC Rapid Lugano and FC Lengnau. The top two teams at the end of the season would be promoted to the 1956–57 NLA and the two last placed teams would be relegated to the 1956–57 Swiss 1. Liga.

== Nationalliga A ==
=== Teams, locations ===
Team	Based in	Canton	Stadium	Capacity
FC Basel	Basel	Basel-Stadt	Landhof	4,000
AC Bellinzona	Bellinzona	Ticino	Stadio Comunale Bellinzona	5,000
FC Chiasso	Chiasso	Ticino	Stadio Comunale Riva IV	4,000
Grasshopper Club Zürich	Zürich	Zürich	Hardturm	20,000
FC Fribourg	Fribourg	Fribourg	Stade Universitaire	9,000
FC Grenchen	Grenchen	Solothurn	Stadium Brühl	10,900
FC La Chaux-de-Fonds	La Chaux-de-Fonds	Neuchâtel	Centre Sportif de la Charrière	10,000
FC Lausanne-Sport	Lausanne	Vaud	Pontaise	30,000
FC Lugano	Lugano	Ticino	Cornaredo Stadium	6,330
FC Schaffhausen	Schaffhausen	Schaffhausen	Stadion Breite	7,300
Servette FC	Geneva	Geneva	Stade des Charmilles	27,000
Urania Genève Sport	Genève	Geneva	Stade de Frontenex	4,000
BSC Young Boys	Bern	Bern	Wankdorf Stadium	56,000
FC Zürich	Zürich	Zürich	Letzigrund	25,000

=== Final league table ===
Pos	Team	Pld	W	D	L	GF	GA	GD	Pts	Qualification
1	Grasshopper Club	26	19	4	3	94	36	+58	42	Swiss Champions qualified for 1956–57 European Cup and Swiss Cup winners
2	La Chaux-de-Fonds	26	14	6	6	65	46	+19	34	
3	Young Boys	26	12	8	6	60	41	+19	32	
4	Servette	26	12	6	8	53	51	+2	30	
5	Bellinzona	26	11	6	9	39	45	−6	28	
6	Chiasso	26	12	3	11	48	47	+1	27	
7	Basel	26	10	6	10	47	50	−3	26	
8	Lausanne-Sport	26	10	5	11	40	50	−10	25	
9	Lugano	26	7	9	10	38	46	−8	23	
10	FC Schaffhausen	26	7	8	11	30	44	−14	22	
11	Urania Genève Sport	26	8	6	12	34	51	−17	22	
12	Zürich	26	8	5	13	55	53	+2	21	
13	Grenchen	26	7	4	15	39	55	−16	18	Relegated to 1956–57 Nationalliga B
14	Fribourg	26	5	4	17	32	59	−27	14	Relegated to 1956–57 Nationalliga B

Source: RSSSF
Rules for classification: 1) Points; 2) Goal difference within the league, however with play-off for qualifiers;

=== Results ===
Home \ Away	BAS	BEL	CDF	CHI	FRI	GCZ	GRE	LS	LUG	SHA	SER	UGS	YB	ZÜR
Basel		2–2	2–0	2–1	9–1	2–5	4–2	2–1	3–2	1–0	1–1	3–0	2–2	3–2
Bellinzona	2–0		2–0	4–2	3–2	2–1	1–3	1–1	3–0	2–0	1–3	3–1	1–1	1–1
La Chaux-de-Fonds	6–2	2–2		1–0	2–0	1–5	5–3	3–1	6–3	3–0	4–2	6–2	0–0	7–3
Chiasso	2–0	2–3	0–0		4–1	3–3	2–0	6–0	0–2	3–0	2–1	2–1	2–3	1–2
Fribourg	1–0	3–0	0–1	0–1		1–2	1–1	3–0	2–2	0–1	2–4	6–3	0–3	2–1
Grasshopper Club	4–2	6–0	3–1	6–1	2–1		6–0	6–2	2–2	2–2	7–2	6–0	3–1	1–2
Grenchen	4–2	1–2	1–3	0–1	2–1	2–3		1–2	2–2	1–1	1–3	2–0	3–0	2–0
Lausanne-Sports	0–1	1–2	2–2	4–1	2–0	0–3	2–0		2–4	1–0	2–1	0–0	1–5	3–1
Lugano	0–0	2–1	1–1	1–2	1–1	1–2	1–1	2–1		3–3	3–0	0–2	0–2	2–1
Schaffhausen	2–2	1–0	2–1	1–0	3–0	1–3	2–1	1–3	1–1		0–0	1–1	1–1	0–1
Servette	3–0	1–0	4–1	2–3	3–3	3–2	2–0	2–4	2–1	1–4		3–2	3–2	2–1
Urania	2–0	1–1	1–2	0–1	2–0	1–5	2–1	1–1	0–1	3–2	1–1		4–2	1–0
Young Boys	4–1	3–0	1–3	7–3	2–1	2–2	5–2	1–1	2–1	3–0	2–2	1–1		4–2
Zürich	1–1	5–0	4–4	3–3	5–0	1–4	2–3	1–3	4–0	7–1	2–2	1–2	2–1	

Source: RSSSF
Legend: Blue = home team win; Yellow = draw; Red = away team win.

=== Topscorers ===
Rank	Player	Nat.	Goals	Club
1.	Branislav Vukosavljević	(Socialist Federal Republic of Yugoslavia)	33	Grasshopper Club
2.	Robert Ballaman	(Switzerland)	19	Grasshopper Club
2.	Charles Antenen	(Switzerland)	19	La Chaux-de-Fonds
5.	Werner Leimgruber	(Switzerland)	17	Zürich
5.	Eugen Meier	(Switzerland)	17	Young Boys
6.	Francis Anker	(Switzerland)	15	Servette
7.	Arturo Capoferri	(Switzerland)	14	Bellinzona
7.	Josef Hügi	(Switzerland)	14	Basel
9.	Raymond Duret	(Switzerland)	13	Grasshopper Club
9.	Kurt Scheller	(Switzerland)	13	Young Boys
9.	Gottlieb Stäuble	(Switzerland)	13	Basel

== Nationalliga B ==
=== Teams, locations ===
Team	Based in	Canton	Stadium	Capacity
FC Bern	Bern	Bern	Stadion Neufeld	14,000
FC Biel-Bienne	Biel/Bienne	Bern	Stadion Gurzelen	5,500
FC Blue Stars Zürich	Zürich	Zürich	Hardhof	1,000
FC Cantonal Neuchâtel	Neuchâtel	Neuchâtel	Stade de la Maladière	25,500
FC Lengnau	Lengnau	Bern	Moos Lengnau BE	3,900
FC Luzern	Lucerne	Lucerne	Stadion Allmend	25,000
ES FC Malley	Malley	Vaud	Centre sportif de la Tuilière	1,500
FC Nordstern Basel	Basel	Basel-Stadt	Rankhof	7,600
FC Rapid Lugano	Lugano	Ticino	Cornaredo Stadium	6,330
FC Solothurn	Solothurn	Solothurn	Stadion FC Solothurn	6,750
FC St. Gallen	St. Gallen	St. Gallen	Espenmoos	11,000
FC Thun	Thun	Bern	Stadion Lachen	10,350
FC Winterthur	Winterthur	Zürich	Schützenwiese	8,550
FC Young Fellows	Zürich	Zürich	Utogrund	2,850

=== Final league table ===
Pos	Team	Pld	W	D	L	GF	GA	GD	Pts	Qualification
1	FC Winterthur	26	14	8	4	60	33	+27	36	NLB Champions and promoted to 1956–57 Nationalliga A
2	Young Fellows Zürich	26	13	8	5	58	45	+13	34	Promoted to 1956–57 Nationalliga A
3	FC Luzern	26	14	5	7	61	43	+18	33	
4	ES FC Malley	26	12	7	7	57	42	+15	31	
5	FC Cantonal Neuchâtel	26	13	4	9	65	46	+19	30	
6	FC Biel-Bienne	26	11	6	9	43	36	+7	28	
7	FC Nordstern Basel	26	11	4	11	63	57	+6	26	
8	FC Bern	26	8	9	9	46	51	−5	25	
9	FC Solothurn	26	7	10	9	42	53	−11	24	
10	FC Lengnau	26	7	9	10	39	63	−24	23	
11	FC St. Gallen	26	6	8	12	48	45	+3	20	
12	FC Thun	26	5	9	12	38	59	−21	19	
13	FC Rapid Lugano	26	5	8	13	31	62	−31	18	Relegated to 1956–57 1. Liga
14	FC Blue Stars Zürich	26	7	3	16	58	74	−16	17	Relegated to 1956–57 1. Liga

Source: RSSSF
Rules for classification: 1) Points; 2) Goal difference within the league, however with play-off for qualifiers;

== Further in Swiss football ==
- 1955–56 Swiss Cup
- 1955–56 Swiss 1. Liga

== Sources ==
- Switzerland 1955–56 at RSSSF

Preceded by 1954–55	Nationalliga seasons in Switzerland	Succeeded by 1956–57
