= Vonlanthen =

Vonlanthen is a Swiss surname. Notable people with the surname include:

- Jo Vonlanthen (born 1942), Swiss racing driver
- Johan Vonlanthen (born 1986), Swiss footballer
- Marcel Vonlanthen (born 1933), Swiss footballer
- Roger Vonlanthen (1930–2020), Swiss footballer
