= Gilbert Fesselet =

Swiss footballer (1928–2022)

Personal information
- Date of birth: 16 April 1928
- Place of birth: La Chaux-de-Fonds, Switzerland
- Date of death: 27 April 2022 (aged 94)
- Position: Defender

Senior career*
Years	Team	Apps	(Gls)
1953–1957	FC La Chaux-de-Fonds		
1957–1960	FC Lausanne-Sport		

International career
1954–1959	Switzerland	5	(0)
- * Club domestic league appearances and goals

Gilbert Fesselet (16 April 1928 – 27 April 2022) was a Swiss football defender who played for Switzerland in the 1954 FIFA World Cup. He also played for FC La Chaux-de-Fonds and FC Lausanne-Sport.

Fesselet died on 27 April 2022, at the age of 94. He was the last surviving player from the Swiss team in 1954 World Cup.
