= Francesco Chiesa (footballer) =

Swiss footballer (born 1931)

Personal information
- Date of birth: 25 September 1931 (age 95)
- Position: Midfielder

Senior career*
Years	Team	Apps	(Gls)
- FC Chiasso

International career
1952–1960	Switzerland	9	(0)
- * Club domestic league appearances and goals

Francesco Chiesa (born 25 September 1931) is a Swiss former footballer who played as a midfielder. He made nine appearances for the Switzerland national team from 1952 to 1960.
