= Branislav Vukosavljević =

Yugoslav footballer

Personal information
- Full name: Branislav Vukosavljević
- Date of birth: 19 September 1929
- Place of birth: Belgrade, Kingdom of Yugoslavia
- Date of death: 10 November 1985 (aged 56)
- Place of death: Belgrade, Yugoslavia
- Positions: Midfielder; striker

Youth career
- Balkan Mirijevo
- Proleter Beograd
- Radnički Beograd

Senior career*
Years	Team	Apps	(Gls)
1947–1953	Red Star Belgrade	71	(28)
1953–1958	Grasshopper		(120)
1958–1960	Winterthur		(19)

International career
1949	Yugoslavia	2	(0)

Managerial career
- 1958–1960: Winterthur
- 1960–1963: Grasshopper
- * Club domestic league appearances and goals

Branislav Vukosavljević (Serbian Cyrillic: Бранислав Вукосављевић; 19 September 1929 – 10 November 1985) was a Yugoslav and Serbian professional football player and manager.

Vukosavljević started his career at his hometown club Red Star Belgrade in 1947 and by the early 1950s won three Marshal Tito Cups and two Yugoslav championship titles with the club, before moving abroad at the age of 24 to join Grasshopper Club Zürich in 1953.

He spent the next five seasons with Grasshopper, where he established himself as a prolific goalscorer. The peak of his career came in the 1955-56 double-winning season, when Vukosavljević was the top Swiss league scorer, with 33 goals, including all six goals in a 6–0 thrashing of AC Bellinzona. He also scored the winning goal in the Swiss Cup final that year, against Young Boys.

In 1958 he joined second-level Swiss side FC Winterthur as a player-manager. In his first season with Winterthur he led the club to the Nationalliga B title and promotion. In the following 1959–60 season he led Winterthur to a mid table finish. He then joined Grasshopper again, this time as a manager, replacing compatriot Toni Pogačnik at the helm.

He spent the next three seasons managing Grasshopper, failing to win any trophies, but did manage to reach the 1963 Swiss Cup final, only to be beaten 0–2 by FC Basel led by Jiří Sobotka.

On the national level he earned two caps playing for Yugoslavia national team, both in 1949, under coach Milorad Arsenijević. In October that year he was named in the starting lineup in Yugoslavia's 1950 World Cup qualifier against France in Paris, and a month later in a friendly against Austria in Belgrade.

After retirement, he moved back to Belgrade, and was active in Red Star's veteran section until his death in 1985, aged 56.

== Honours ==
=== Player ===
Red Star Belgrade

- First Federal League of Yugoslavia (2): 1951, 1952–53
- Marshal Tito Cup (3): 1948, 1949, 1950

Grasshopper

- Swiss First Division (1): 1955–56
- Swiss Cup (1): 1956

=== Player-manager ===
Winterthur

- Swiss Second Division (1): 1958–59

=== Manager ===
Grasshopper

- Swiss Cup runner-up (1): 1963
