= Frank Angong =

Cameroonian footballer

Personal information
- Full name: Franck Angong Ebolo
- Date of birth: 5 July 2002 (age 24)
- Place of birth: Douala, Cameroon
- Height: 1.79 m (5 ft 10 in)
- Position: Midfielder

Youth career
- 2020–2021: Barcelona

Senior career*
| Years | Team | Apps | (Gls) |
| 2019–2020 | Cibao | 4 | (3) |
| 2021–2022 | Barcelona B | 0 | (0) |
| 2021–2022 | → Covilhã (loan) | 2 | (0) |
| 2022 | → Cultural Leonesa (loan) | 12 | (2) |
| 2022–2024 | Intercity | 5 | (0) |
| 2023 | → Betis Deportivo (loan) | 3 | (0) |
| 2024–2025 | Hércules | 2 | (0) |
- * Club domestic league appearances and goals as of 20 January 2025

Franck Angong Ebolo (born 5 July 2002) is a Cameroonian professional footballer who plays as a midfielder.

== Career ==
Angong started his career with Dominican Republic side Cibao. In 2020, Angong joined the youth academy of Barcelona, one of Spain's most successful clubs. In August 2021, Angong joined Liga Portugal 2 club S.C. Covilhã on a season-long loan. On 1 February 2022, Angong joined Cultural Leonesa on loan for the remainder of the season.

On 18 September 2024, Angong joined Hércules in the third tier.
