= 1954–55 Swiss 1. Liga =

1. Liga
- Season: 1954–55
- Champions: 1. Liga champions: FC Lengnau; Group West: FC Montreux-Sports; Group Cenral: FC Lengnau; Group South and East: FC Rapid Lugano
- Promoted: FC Lengnau; FC Rapid Lugano
- Relegated: Group West: FC Aigle; Central Fribourg; Group Central: FC Nidau; Group South and East: FC Küsnacht
- Matches: 3 times 132 and 3 deciders plus 3 play-offs and 3 play-outs

The 1954–55 1. Liga season was the 23rd season of the 1. Liga since its creation in 1931. At this time, the 1. Liga was the third-tier of the Swiss football league system and it was the highest level of totally amateur football, because at this time, the clubs in the two higher divisions in Switzerland were starting to employ semi-professional and even professional players.

== Format ==
There were 36 teams competing in the 1. Liga this season. They were divided into three regional groups, each group with 12 teams. Within each group, the teams would play a double round-robin to decide their league position. Two points were awarded for a win and one point was awarded for a draw. The three group winners then contested a play-off round to decide the two promotion slots. The last placed team in each group were directly relegated to the 2. Liga (fourth tier). The three second last placed teams were to contest a play-out to decide the fourth relegation slot.

== Group West ==
=== Teams, locations ===
Club	Based in	Canton	Stadium	Capacity
FC Aigle	Aigle	Vaud	Les Glariers	1,000
US Bienne-Boujean	Biel/Bienne	Bern		
FC Central Fribourg	Fribourg	Fribourg	Guintzet	2,000
FC La Tour/Le Pâquier	La Tour-de-Trême (Bulle)	Fribourg	Stade de Bouleyres	7,000
US Lausanne	Lausanne	Vaud		
FC Martigny-Sports	Martigny	Valais	Stade d'Octodure	2,500
FC Monthey	Monthey	Valais	Stade Philippe Pottier	1,800
FC Montreux-Sports	Montreux	Vaud	Stade de Chailly	1,000
FC Forward Morges	Morges	Vaud	Parc des Sports	600
FC Sierre	Sierre	Valais	Complexe Ecossia	2,000
FC Sion	Sion	Valais	Parc des sports (Tourbillon)	8,000
Vevey Sports	Vevey	Vaud	Stade de Copet	4,000

=== Final league table ===
Pos	Team	Pld	W	D	L	GF	GA	GD	Pts	Qualification or relegation
1	FC Montreux-Sports	22	12	7	3	44	24	+20	31	To promotion play-off
2	US Bienne-Boujean	22	13	4	5	69	39	+30	30	
3	FC Sion	22	13	2	7	56	46	+10	28	
4	Vevey Sports	22	10	5	7	37	26	+11	25	
5	FC Sierre	22	10	5	7	33	35	−2	25	
6	FC Martigny-Sports	22	10	4	8	60	37	+23	24	
7	FC Forward Morges	22	8	4	10	36	41	−5	20	
8	US Lausanne	22	7	6	9	37	43	−6	20	
9	FC Monthey	22	8	4	10	41	49	−8	20	
10	CS La Tour-de-Peilz	22	9	1	12	44	45	−1	19	
11	FC Aigle	22	5	5	12	38	69	−31	15	Play-out against relegation
12	Central Fribourg	22	2	3	17	36	77	−41	7	Relegation to 2. Liga

Source: RSSSF
Rules for classification: 1) Points; 2) Goal difference within the league, but decider play-off for qualifiers.

== Group Central ==
=== Teams, locations ===
Club	Based in	Canton	Stadium	Capacity
FC Aarau	Aarau	Aargau	Stadion Brügglifeld	9,240
SC Burgdorf	Burgdorf	Bern	Stadion Neumatt	3,850
FC Concordia Basel	Basel	Basel-Stadt	Stadion Rankhof	7,000
SR Delémont	Delémont	Jura	La Blancherie	5,263
FC Helvetia Bern	Bern	Bern	Spitalacker, Bern	1,000
SC Kleinhüningen	Basel	Basel-Stadt	Sportplatz Schorenmatte	300
FC Lengnau	Lengnau	Bern	Moos Lengnau BE	3,900
FC Moutier	Moutier	Bern	Stade de Chalière	5,000
FC Nidau|	Nidau	Bern	Burgerallee	1,000
FC Olten	Olten	Solothurn	Sportanlagen Kleinholz	8,000
FC Porrentruy	Porrentruy	Jura	Stade du Tirage	4,226
Saint-Imier-Sports	Saint-Imier	Bern	Terrain de Fin-des-Fourches	1,000

=== Final league table ===
Pos	Team	Pld	W	D	L	GF	GA	GD	Pts	Qualification or relegation
1	FC Lengnau	22	19	1	2	82	23	+59	39	To promotion play-off
2	FC Porrentruy	22	16	4	2	74	22	+52	36	
3	FC Moutier	22	12	5	5	53	38	+15	29	
4	FC Concordia Basel	22	11	6	5	58	41	+17	28	
5	FC Aarau	22	8	6	8	38	25	+13	22	
6	SC Kleinhüningen	22	9	4	9	52	48	+4	22	
7	SC Burgdorf	22	6	8	8	47	47	0	20	
8	FC Olten	22	8	4	10	36	43	−7	20	
9	SR Delémont	22	8	2	12	38	45	−7	18	
10	Saint-Imier-Sports	22	6	3	13	43	60	−17	15	
11	FC Helvetia Bern	22	5	4	13	34	57	−23	14	Play-out against relegation
12	FC Nidau	22	0	1	21	18	124	−106	1	Relegation to 2. Liga

Source: RSSSF
Rules for classification: 1) Points; 2) Goal difference within the league, but decider play-off for qualifiers.

== Group South and East ==
=== Teams, locations ===
Club	Based in	Canton	Stadium	Capacity
FC Baden	Baden	Aargau	Esp Stadium	7,000
FC Bodio	Bodio	Ticino	Campo comunale Pollegio	1,000
SC Brühl	St. Gallen	St. Gallen	Paul-Grüninger-Stadion	4,200
FC Küsnacht	Küsnacht	Zürich	Sportanlage Heslibach	2,300
FC Mendrisio	Mendrisio	Ticino	Centro Sportivo Comunale	4,000
FC Oerlikon	Oerlikon (Zürich)	Zürich	Sportanlage Neudorf	1,000
US Pro Daro	Bellinzona	Ticino	Campo Geretta / Stadio Comunale Bellinzona	500 / 5,000
FC Rapid Lugano	Lugano	Ticino	Cornaredo Stadium	6,330
FC Red Star Zürich	Zürich	Zürich	Allmend Brunau	2,000
FC Rorschach	Rorschach	Schwyz	Sportplatz Kellen	1,000
FC Wil	Wil	St. Gallen	Sportpark Bergholz	6,048
SC Zug	Zug	Zug	Herti Allmend Stadion	6,000

=== Final league table ===
Pos	Team	Pld	W	D	L	GF	GA	GD	Pts	Qualification or relegation
1	FC Rapid Lugano	22	14	3	5	53	24	+29	31	To promotion play-off
2	FC Mendrisio	22	11	6	5	39	30	+9	28	
3	SC Zug	22	13	2	7	41	33	+8	28	
4	FC Wil	22	9	7	6	38	33	+5	25	
5	FC Oerlikon	22	11	2	9	37	31	+6	24	
6	FC Bodio	22	9	3	10	32	32	0	21	
7	FC Baden	22	9	2	11	39	38	+1	20	
8	SC Brühl	22	8	4	10	30	38	−8	20	
9	FC Rorschach	22	7	5	10	30	43	−13	19	
10	US Pro Daro	22	8	2	12	28	30	−2	18	To decider for tenth place
11	FC Red Star Zürich	22	6	6	10	26	32	−6	18	To decider for tenth place
12	FC Küsnacht	22	5	2	15	30	59	−29	12	Relegation to 2. Liga

Source: RSSSF
Rules for classification: 1) Points; 2) Goal difference within the league, but decider play-off for qualifiers.

=== Decider for tenth place ===
The deciders were played on 9 and 26 June 1955.

Team 1	Score	Team 2
FC Red Star Zürich	1–0	US Pro Daro
US Pro Daro	2–0	FC Red Star Zürich

The result was 2–2 on aggregate, therefore a replay was required. This was played on 3 July in Lucerne.

Team 1	Score	Team 2
FC Red Star Zürich	2–1	US Pro Daro

FC Red Star Zürich win and remain in division. US Pro Daro continue in the play-outs against relegation.

== Promotion, relegation ==
=== Promotion play-off ===
The three group winners played a single round-robin to decide the two promotion slots. The promotion play-offs were held 19 and 26 June and 3 July.

Pos	Team	Pld	W	D	L	GF	GA	GD	Pts	Qualification	LEN	RALU	MOS
1	FC Lengnau	2	2	0	0	10	2	+8	4	Champions and promoted	—	1–0	—
2	FC Rapid Lugano	2	1	0	1	6	2	+4	2	Promoted	—	—	6–1
3	FC Montreux-Sports	2	0	0	2	3	15	−12	0		2–9	—	—

Source: RSSSF
Rules for classification: 1) Points; 2) Head-to-head 3) Decider.

FC Lengnau are 1. Liga Champions and together with runners-up FC Rapid Lugano were promoted to 1955–56 Nationalliga B.

=== Relegation play-out ===
The three second last placed teams from each group contested a play-out to decide the fourth and final relegation slot. The matches in the play-outs were held on 26 June, 10 and 17 July.

Pos	Team	Pld	W	D	L	GF	GA	GD	Pts	Relegation	PRO	HEL	AIG
1	US Pro Daro	2	1	1	0	8	2	+6	3		—	6–0	—
2	FC Helvetia Bern	2	1	0	1	6	9	−3	2		—	—	6–3
3	FC Aigle	2	0	1	1	5	8	−3	1	Relegated to 2. Liga	2–2	—	—

Source: RSSSF
Rules for classification: 1) Points; 2) Head-to-head 3) Decider.

US Pro Daro and Helvetia Bern remained in the division, FC Aigle were relegated to 2. Liga.

== Further in Swiss football ==
- 1954–55 Nationalliga A
- 1954–55 Nationalliga B
- 1954–55 Swiss Cup

== Sources ==
- Switzerland 1954–55 at RSSSF

Preceded by 1953–54	Seasons in Swiss 1. Liga	Succeeded by 1955–56
