= FC Fribourg =

Swiss football club

Fribourg
- Full name: Football Club Fribourg
- Founded: 21 October 1900
- Ground: Stade Universitaire
- Capacity: 9,000) (1,000 seated
- President: Magdalena Lauper
- Entraineur: Turgut Akdag
- League: 2._Liga_Interregional
Home colours	Away colours

FC Fribourg is a Swiss football club from the town of Fribourg in the Canton of Fribourg. In the 2022–23 season, the team plays in 2. Liga Interregional, the fifth highest tier in the Swiss football pyramid.

== History ==
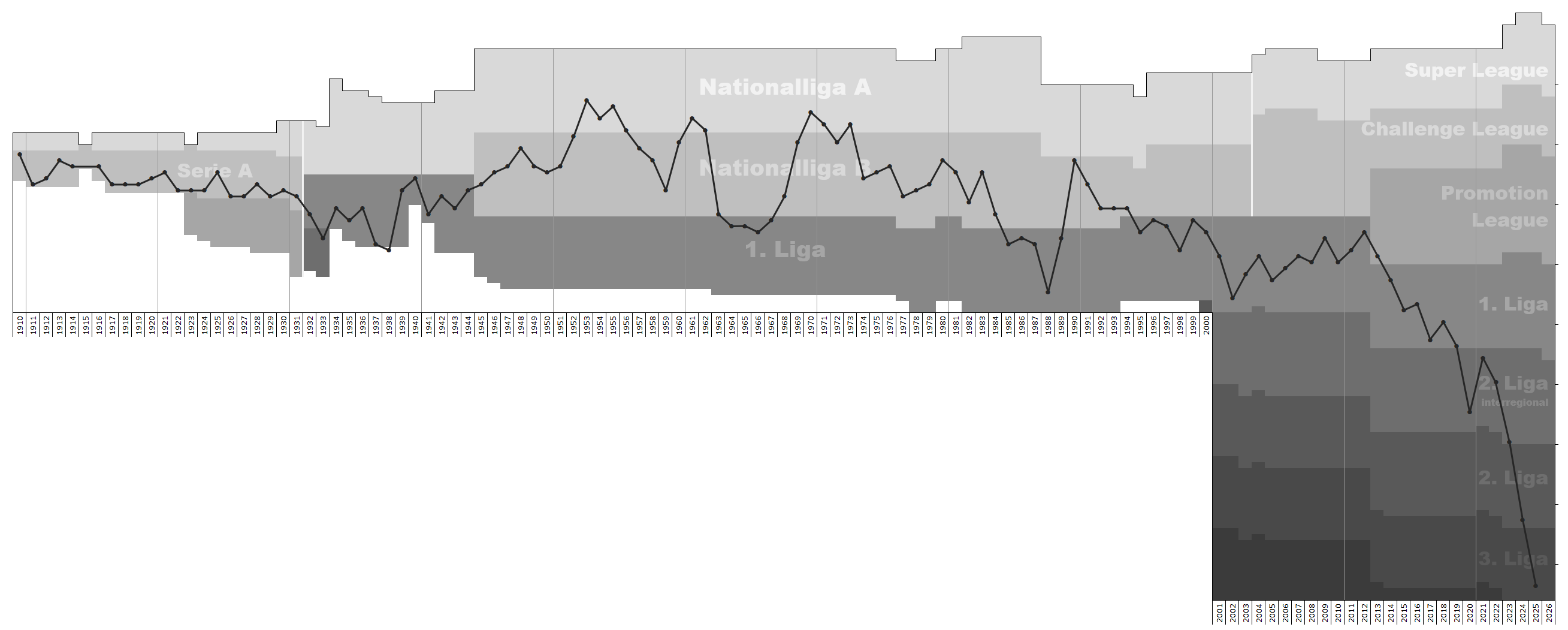
Chart of FC Fribourg table positions in the Swiss football league system

The club was founded on 21 October 1900 and began life as FC Technicum. It took its name from the local school where nine young men gathered in the school brewery to establish the foundations for a football club. The majority of the men were not local, most of the men were students from England. The team had to wait over a year for their first match. On 27 October 1901 the club lost 4–1 to Club Romand.

On 25 September 1904, FC Technicum became a member of Swiss Football Association. On 12 November 1904 the club changed its name to Stella FC. The club at the time were competing in Nationalliga B, the second highest tier in Swiss football. It was around this time, in 1909, that the club held their first match against foreign opponents by playing two matches against Milan Football and Cricket Club. In 1909 the club were promoted to Swiss Super League but lasted just two seasons and in 1911 the club were relegated. In 1910 the club opened a junior team, led by local priest Father Freeley, to serve as a nursery side for the 1st team. This, at the time, was considered to be something new. The junior side was named FC College.

World War I put a stop to the club's progress and between 1914 and 1916 the club did not participate in any official championship. On 22 July 1917 the club changed its name to its present name, FC Fribourg.

In 1929 the club was back in the Swiss Super League but again this was just for two seasons as in 1931 the club dropped down a tier.

During World War II there was some minor interruptions to the football calendar but in the 1939–40 season the club narrowly missed out on promotion back to the Super League by losing a play-off match against FC Basel.

The golden era of the club was in the 1950s. At the end of the 1951–52 season the club were champions of Nationalliga B and so were back in the top flight to play in the 1952–53 season. The club spent four years in the top league finishing 9th in 1952–53, 12th in 1952–53, 10th in 1954–55 and 14th place in 1955–56. In 1954 the club also reached the final of the Swiss Cup losing 2–0 to FC La Chaux-de-Fonds, the best Swiss club at that time, inside the Wankdorf Stadium which later became the Stade de Suisse.

In the 1960–61 season the club was back in the top flight but were relegated in 1962 after only two seasons, finishing in last place. In 1969 the club were back in the top flight but again the club lasted just two years and were relegated in 1971. The club bounced back at the first attempt and at the end of the 1971–72 season they gained promotion back to the Super League but lasted just one term, as they suffered relegation at the end of the 1972–73 season. This was to be for the last time as to this day the club have not played in the top level of Swiss football.

Directly following their relegation to the second tier, the club suffered relegation again to the third tier, the 1. Liga, for the first time in their history at the end of the 1973–74 season. The club stayed at that level for four years before returning to the Nationalliga B. The club remained at this level until 1999 when they suffered relegation to the 1. Liga Promotion.

== Stadium ==
FC Fribourg play their home games at Stade Universitaire. The capacity is 9,000. The stadium has 1,000 seats and 8,000 standing places.

== Current squad ==
As of 1 October 2020

Note: Flags indicate national team as defined under FIFA eligibility rules; some limited exceptions apply. Players may hold more than one non-FIFA nationality.

No.	Pos.	Nation	Player
1	GK	SUI	Piero Soldini
2	DF	KOS	Clirim Ademi
3	DF	CPV	Remy Mendes Cabral
4	MF	POR	Vasco Teixeira
5	MF	POR	Fabio Furtado
6	MF	SUI	Joël Raetzo
7	FW	SUI	Maxime Mason
8	MF	SUI	Vincent Villommet
9	FW	MLI	Karim Diarra
10	MF	POR	Bryan Rodrigues
11	FW	COL	Santiago Cerezo
13	DF	CPV	Sami Varela

No.	Pos.	Nation	Player
14	FW	KOS	Qëndrim Makshana
15	DF	SUI	Michel Oberlin
17	FW	COD	Nathan Dimbu
18	DF	SWE	Olle Egil Chaplin Economidis
20	MF	POR	Simão Magalhaes
21	FW	POR	Kevin de Oliveira
22	DF	SUI	César Schwartz
23	MF	SUI	Matéo Rusca
24	DF	SUI	Jean Assui
25	MF	KOS	Fabijan Markaj
30	GK	SUI	Simon Monney

== Honours ==
- Ligue Nationale B/Challenge League
  - Winners (1): 1951–52
- Swiss Cup
  - Runners-up (1): 1953–54
