= Josef Epp =

Austrian footballer (1920–1989)

Personal information
- Date of birth: 1 March 1920
- Place of birth: Austria
- Date of death: 28 February 1989 (aged 68)
- Position: Forward

Senior career*
Years	Team	Apps	(Gls)
1937–1950	Wiener Sportclub		
1950–1951	Linzer ASK		
1951–1953	First Vienna		
1953–1955	Servette FC		
1957–1958	Linzer ASK		

International career
1946–1948	Austria	8	(5)

Managerial career
- 1958–1960: Linzer ASK
- * Club domestic league appearances and goals

Josef Epp (1 March 1920 – 28 February 1989) was an Austrian footballer, who competed at the 1948 Summer Olympic Games. He played in the forward position.
