= 1955–56 Swiss 1. Liga =

Swiss football league season

1. Liga
- Season: 1955–56
- Champions: 1. Liga champions: Yverdon-Sport; Group West: Yverdon-Sport; Group Cenral: Aarau; Group South and East: Brühl
- Promoted: Yverdon-Sport; Brühl
- Relegated: Group West: US Lausanne; Group Central: Helvetia Bern; Group South and East: Polizei Zürich; SC Zug
- Matches: 3 times 132 plus 3 play-offs and 3 play-outs

The 1955–56 1. Liga season was the 24th season of the 1. Liga since its creation in 1931. At this time, the 1. Liga was the third-tier of the Swiss football league system and it was the highest level of total amateur football, because at this time, the clubs in the two higher divisions in Switzerland were starting to employ semi-professional and even professional players.

== Format ==
There were 36 teams competing in the 1. Liga 1955–56 season. They were divided into three regional groups, each group with 12 teams. Within each group, the teams would play a double round-robin to decide their league position. Two points were awarded for a win and one point was awarded for a draw. The three group winners then contested a play-off round to decide the two promotion slots. The last placed team in each group were directly relegated to the 2. Liga (fourth tier). The three second last placed teams were to contest a play-out to decide the fourth relegation slot.

== Group West ==
=== Teams, locations ===
| Club | Based in | Canton | Stadium | Capacity |
|---|---|---|---|---|
| US Bienne-Boujean | Biel/Bienne | Bern | | |
| CS International Genève | Geneva | Geneva | | |
| CS La Tour-de-Peilz | La Tour-de-Peilz | Vaud | Stade de Bel-Air | 1,000 |
| US Lausanne | Lausanne | Vaud | | |
| FC Martigny-Sports | Martigny | Valais | Stade d'Octodure | 2,500 |
| FC Monthey | Monthey | Valais | Stade Philippe Pottier | 1,800 |
| FC Montreux-Sports | Montreux | Vaud | Stade de Chailly | 1,000 |
| FC Forward Morges | Morges | Vaud | Parc des Sports | 600 |
| FC Sierre | Sierre | Valais | Complexe Ecossia | 2,000 |
| FC Sion | Sion | Valais | Parc des sports (Tourbillon) | 8,000 |
| Vevey Sports | Vevey | Vaud | Stade de Copet | 4,000 |
| Yverdon-Sport FC | Yverdon-les-Bains | Vaud | Stade Municipal | 6,600 |

=== Final league table ===
| Pos | Team | Pld | W | D | L | GF | GA | GD | Pts | Qualification or relegation |
|---|---|---|---|---|---|---|---|---|---|---|
| 1 | Yverdon-Sport FC | 22 | 16 | 3 | 3 | 64 | 22 | +42 | 35 | Play-off to Nationalliga B |
| 2 | US Bienne-Boujean | 22 | 14 | 3 | 5 | 65 | 44 | +21 | 31 | |
| 3 | FC Monthey | 22 | 14 | 2 | 6 | 62 | 32 | +30 | 30 | |
| 4 | Vevey Sports | 22 | 11 | 6 | 5 | 60 | 31 | +29 | 28 | |
| 5 | FC Martigny-Sports | 22 | 11 | 4 | 7 | 41 | 32 | +9 | 26 | |
| 6 | FC Sion | 22 | 11 | 3 | 8 | 38 | 35 | +3 | 25 | |
| 7 | CS La Tour-de-Peilz | 22 | 6 | 7 | 9 | 42 | 49 | −7 | 19 | |
| 8 | FC Sierre | 22 | 8 | 1 | 13 | 36 | 55 | −19 | 17 | |
| 9 | FC Montreux-Sports | 22 | 7 | 3 | 12 | 34 | 55 | −21 | 17 | |
| 10 | FC Forward Morges | 22 | 5 | 6 | 11 | 31 | 61 | −30 | 16 | |
| 11 | CS International Genève | 22 | 5 | 2 | 15 | 38 | 60 | −22 | 12 | Play-out against relegation |
| 12 | US Lausanne | 22 | 2 | 4 | 16 | 22 | 57 | −35 | 8 | Relegation to 2. Liga |

Source: rsssf
Rules for classification: 1) Points; 2) Goal difference within the league, but decider play-off for qualifiers.

== Group Central ==
=== Teams, locations ===
| Club | Based in | Canton | Stadium | Capacity |
|---|---|---|---|---|
| FC Aarau | Aarau | Aargau | Stadion Brügglifeld | 9,240 |
| FC Bassecourt | Bassecourt | Jura | Stade des Grands-Prés | 3,650 |
| FC Birsfelden | Birsfelden | Basel-Landschaft | Sternenfeld | 9,400 |
| SC Burgdorf | Burgdorf | Bern | Stadion Neumatt | 3,850 |
| FC Concordia Basel | Basel | Basel-Stadt | Stadion Rankhof | 7,000 |
| SR Delémont | Delémont | Jura | La Blancherie | 5,263 |
| FC Helvetia Bern | Bern | Bern | Spitalacker, Bern | 1,000 |
| SC Kleinhüningen | Basel | Basel-Stadt | Sportplatz Schorenmatte | 300 |
| FC Moutier | Moutier | Bern | Stade de Chalière | 5,000 |
| FC Olten | Olten | Solothurn | Sportanlagen Kleinholz | 8,000 |
| FC Porrentruy | Porrentruy | Jura | Stade du Tirage | 4,226 |
| Saint-Imier-Sports | Saint-Imier | Bern | Terrain de Fin-des-Fourches | 1,000 |

=== Final league table ===
| Pos | Team | Pld | W | D | L | GF | GA | GD | Pts | Qualification or relegation |
|---|---|---|---|---|---|---|---|---|---|---|
| 1 | FC Aarau | 22 | 16 | 4 | 2 | 60 | 26 | +34 | 36 | Play-off to Nationalliga B |
| 2 | FC Concordia Basel | 22 | 15 | 5 | 2 | 80 | 36 | +44 | 35 | |
| 3 | FC Porrentruy | 22 | 13 | 4 | 5 | 57 | 36 | +21 | 30 | |
| 4 | FC Bassecourt | 22 | 10 | 5 | 7 | 36 | 33 | +3 | 25 | |
| 5 | FC Olten | 22 | 9 | 6 | 7 | 58 | 46 | +12 | 24 | |
| 6 | SR Delémont | 22 | 8 | 5 | 9 | 51 | 59 | −8 | 21 | |
| 7 | SC Burgdorf | 22 | 7 | 5 | 10 | 52 | 50 | +2 | 19 | |
| 8 | FC Birsfelden | 22 | 7 | 3 | 12 | 53 | 65 | −12 | 17 | |
| 9 | SC Kleinhüningen | 22 | 4 | 9 | 9 | 50 | 66 | −16 | 17 | |
| 10 | Saint-Imier-Sports | 22 | 6 | 4 | 12 | 31 | 58 | −27 | 16 | |
| 11 | FC Moutier | 22 | 4 | 6 | 12 | 30 | 48 | −18 | 14 | Play-out against relegation |
| 12 | FC Helvetia Bern | 22 | 4 | 2 | 16 | 39 | 74 | −35 | 10 | Relegation to 2. Liga |

Source: rsssf
Rules for classification: 1) Points; 2) Goal difference within the league, but decider play-off for qualifiers.

== Group South and East ==
=== Teams, locations ===
| Club | Based in | Canton | Stadium | Capacity |
|---|---|---|---|---|
| FC Baden | Baden | Aargau | Esp Stadium | 7,000 |
| FC Bodio | Bodio | Ticino | Campo comunale Pollegio | 1,000 |
| SC Brühl | St. Gallen | St. Gallen | Paul-Grüninger-Stadion | 4,200 |
| FC Locarno | Locarno | Ticino | Stadio comunale Lido | 5,000 |
| FC Mendrisio | Mendrisio | Ticino | Centro Sportivo Comunale | 4,000 |
| FC Oerlikon | Oerlikon (Zürich) | Zürich | Sportanlage Neudorf | 1,000 |
| Polizei ZH | Oerlikon (Zürich) | Zürich | Sportanlage Neudorf | 1,000 |
| US Pro Daro | Bellinzona | Ticino | Campo Geretta / Stadio Comunale Bellinzona | 500 / 5,000 |
| FC Red Star Zürich | Zürich | Zürich | Allmend Brunau | 2,000 |
| FC Rorschach | Rorschach | Schwyz | Sportplatz Kellen | 1,000 |
| FC Wil | Wil | St. Gallen | Sportpark Bergholz | 6,048 |
| SC Zug | Zug | Zug | Herti Allmend Stadion | 6,000 |

=== Final league table ===
| Pos | Team | Pld | W | D | L | GF | GA | GD | Pts | Qualification or relegation |
|---|---|---|---|---|---|---|---|---|---|---|
| 1 | SC Brühl | 22 | 14 | 2 | 6 | 60 | 30 | +30 | 30 | Play-off to Nationalliga B |
| 2 | FC Mendrisio | 22 | 11 | 7 | 4 | 43 | 31 | +12 | 29 | |
| 3 | FC Baden | 22 | 11 | 5 | 6 | 52 | 36 | +16 | 27 | |
| 4 | FC Wil | 22 | 9 | 5 | 8 | 40 | 36 | +4 | 23 | |
| 5 | FC Locarno | 22 | 9 | 5 | 8 | 35 | 36 | −1 | 23 | |
| 6 | FC Red Star Zürich | 22 | 8 | 6 | 8 | 33 | 28 | +5 | 22 | |
| 7 | US Pro Daro Bellinzona | 22 | 7 | 7 | 8 | 31 | 25 | +6 | 21 | |
| 8 | FC Rorschach | 22 | 8 | 4 | 10 | 32 | 42 | −10 | 20 | |
| 9 | FC Oerlikon | 22 | 6 | 8 | 8 | 38 | 51 | −13 | 20 | |
| 10 | FC Bodio | 22 | 7 | 5 | 10 | 29 | 40 | −11 | 19 | |
| 11 | Polizei Zürich | 22 | 7 | 4 | 11 | 32 | 45 | −13 | 18 | Play-out against relegation |
| 12 | SC Zug | 22 | 4 | 4 | 14 | 34 | 59 | −25 | 12 | Relegation to 2. Liga |

Source: rsssf
Rules for classification: 1) Points; 2) Goal difference within the league, but decider play-off for qualifiers.

== Promotion, relegation ==
=== Promotion play-off ===
The three group winners played a single round-robin to decide the two promotion slots. The games were played on 17, 24 June and 1 July 1956.

| Pos | Team | Pld | W | D | L | GF | GA | GD | Pts | Qualification or relegation | YVE | BRÜ | AAR |
|---|---|---|---|---|---|---|---|---|---|---|---|---|---|
| 1 | Yverdon-Sport FC | 2 | 1 | 1 | 0 | 5 | 3 | +2 | 3 | Champions and promoted | — | 4–2 | — |
| 2 | SC Brühl | 2 | 1 | 0 | 1 | 4 | 4 | 0 | 2 | Promoted | — | — | 2–0 |
| 3 | FC Aarau | 2 | 0 | 1 | 1 | 1 | 3 | −2 | 1 | | 1–1 | — | — |

Source: rsssf
Rules for classification: 1) Points; 2) Head-to-head 3) Decider.

Yverdon-Sport became 1. Liga champions and together with second placed Brühl were promoted to the 1956–57 Nationalliga B.

=== Relegation play-out ===
The three second last placed teams from each group contested a play-out to decide the fourth and final relegation slot. The games were played on 17 June and 1 July 1956.

| Pos | Team | Pld | W | D | L | GF | GA | GD | Pts | Qualification or relegation | MOU | INT | POL |
|---|---|---|---|---|---|---|---|---|---|---|---|---|---|
| 1 | FC Moutier | 1 | 1 | 0 | 0 | 4 | 0 | +4 | 2 | | — | — | 4–0 |
| 2 | CS International Genève | 1 | 1 | 0 | 0 | 3 | 2 | +1 | 2 | | n/p | — | — |
| 3 | Polizei Zürich | 2 | 0 | 0 | 2 | 2 | 7 | −5 | 0 | Relegated to 2. Liga | — | 2–3 | — |

Source: rsssf
Rules for classification: 1) Points; 2) Head-to-head 3) Decider.

The match International Genève–Moutier was not played. Both teams remained in the division, Polizei Zürich were relegated to 2. Liga.

== Further in Swiss football ==
- 1955–56 Nationalliga A
- 1955–56 Nationalliga B
- 1955–56 Swiss Cup

== Sources ==
- Switzerland 1955–56 at RSSSF

| Preceded by 1954–55 | Seasons in Swiss 1. Liga | Succeeded by 1956–57 |
