= Marcel Mauron =

Swiss footballer (1929–2022)

Personal information
- Date of birth: 25 March 1929
- Place of birth: Geneva, Switzerland
- Date of death: 21 January 2022 (aged 92)
- Position: Forward

Senior career*
| Years | Team | Apps | (Gls) |
| 1946–1951 | Young Fellows Juventus | | |
| 1951–1958 | FC La Chaux-de-Fonds | | |
| 1958–1959 | Servette | | |
| 1959–1960 | Neuchâtel Xamax | | |
| 1960–1964 | FC Grenchen | | |
| 1964–1966 | Neuchâtel Xamax | | |

International career
| 1952–1957 | Switzerland | 10 | (2) |

Managerial career
- 1976: FC La Chaux-de-Fonds
- * Club domestic league appearances and goals

Marcel Mauron (25 March 1929 – 21 January 2022) was a Swiss footballer who played as a forward.

He played for the Switzerland national team in the 1954 FIFA World Cup. He also played for Young Fellows Juventus, FC La Chaux-de-Fonds, Servette, Neuchâtel Xamax, and FC Grenchen.

Mauron died on 21 January 2022, at the age of 92. His nephew, Yves, also played football.
