= Swiss Cup =

- Founded: 1925; 101 years ago
- Region: Switzerland
- Teams: 64
- Qualifier for: UEFA Europa League
- Current champions: FC St. Gallen (2nd title)
- Most championships: Grasshoppers (19 titles)
- Broadcaster: SRG SSR
- Website: www.football.ch/it/ASF/Coppa-Svizzera/Coppa-Svizzera-Uomini/Statistiche-e-risultati-Coppa-Svizzera.aspx (in Italian)
- 2025–26 Swiss Cup

The Swiss Cup (German: Schweizer Cup; French: Coupe de Suisse; Italian: Coppa Svizzera; Romansh: Cuppa Svizra) is a football cup competition that has been organised annually since 1925–26 season by the Swiss Football Association.

The Swiss Cup final is usually the most important game of the year with a high attendance. The competition is also shaped by games in the first rounds when villages celebrate the tie of their club with a professional team leading to infrastructure improvements and often thousands of spectators at the local football pitch. Since 1999 the cup winners earns the chance to qualify for the UEFA Europa League or the UEFA Conference League in accordance with the rankings of Switzerland in the UEFA coefficient.

== History ==
=== Forerunners ===
Before the foundation of the Swiss Cup, there were two attempts at creating a Swiss football cup competition: the Anglo Cup (1909–1913) and the Och Cup (1920–1922).

==== Anglo Cup and winners ====
The Anglo Cup was played from 1909–1910 to 1912–1913.

Season	Winners	Runners-up	Score	Note
1909–10	Young Boys	St. Gallen	1–1	7–0 replay
1910–11	Young Boys	Servette	3–1	
1911–12	Young Boys	Stella Fribourg	4–0	
1912–13	Basel	FC Weissenbühl Bern	5–0	

==== Och Cup and winners ====
The Och Cup (named after the sporting goods company "Och Frères") was played in 1920–21 and 1921–22. The Swiss football and athletics association (which was how the Swiss Football Association was called between 1919 and 1955) stated the following in its annual report: "The well-known sports company Och Frères has provided the football department with a cup called the Och Cup. This cup is intended to replace the former "Anglo Cup" and is to be played according to the system of the English FA Cup ". FC Bern was the first club to win the new trophy, Concordia Basel won the second edition. Then in 1925, as the Swiss Football Association decided to launch its own official Swiss Cup, the Och Cup was played-out between the two previous winners. In the play-off on 11 January 1925, FC Bern beat Concordia Basel 2-0 and thus definitely came into possession of the Och Cup. The original trophy is now again in the possession of the Och family.

Season	Winners	Runners-up	Score	Note
1920–21	FC Bern	La Chaux-de-Fonds	5–0	Match one of three
1920–21	FC Bern	Zürich	2–1	Match two of three
1920–21	La Chaux-de-Fonds	Zürich	–	Not played
1921–22	Concordia Basel	Étoile-Sporting	1–0	
1924–25	FC Bern	Concordia Basel	2–0	

=== Foundation ===
Upon the initiative of Eugen Landolt (the then President of FC Baden) the competition called "Swiss Cup" was organized in the season 1925–26 by the Swiss Football and Athletics Association (SFAV), as the Swiss Football Association used to call itself.

== Swiss Cup finals ==
Season	Winners	Runners-up	Score	Note
1925–26	Grasshopper Club Zürich	FC Bern	2–1	
1926–27	Grasshopper Club Zürich	Young Fellows Zürich	3–1	
1927–28	Servette FC	Grasshopper Club Zürich	5–1	
1928–29	Urania Genève Sport	Young Boys	1–0	
1929–30	Young Boys	FC Aarau	1–0	
1930–31	FC Lugano	Grasshopper Club Zürich	2–1	(a.e.t.)
1931–32	Grasshopper Club Zürich	Urania Genève Sports	5–1	
1932–33	FC Basel	Grasshopper Club Zürich	4–3	
1933–34	Grasshopper Club Zürich	Servette FC	2–0	
1934–35	Lausanne-Sport	FC Nordstern Basel	10–0	
1935–36	Young Fellows Zürich	Servette FC	2–0	
1936–37	Grasshopper Club Zürich	Lausanne-Sport	10–0	
1937–38	Grasshopper Club Zürich	Servette FC	2–2	5–1 replay
1938–39	Lausanne-Sport	FC Nordstern Basel	2–0	
1939–40	Grasshopper Club Zürich	FC Grenchen	3–0	
1940–41	Grasshopper Club Zürich	Servette FC	1–1	2–0 replay
1941–42	Grasshopper Club Zürich	FC Basel	1–1	3–2 replay
1942–43	Grasshopper Club Zürich	FC Lugano	2–1	
1943–44	Lausanne-Sport	FC Basel	3–0	
1944–45	Young Boys	FC St. Gallen	2–0	(a.e.t.)
1945–46	Grasshopper Club Zürich	Lausanne-Sport	3–0	
1946–47	FC Basel	Lausanne-Sport	3–0	
1947–48	FC La Chaux-de-Fonds	FC Grenchen	2–2	4–0 replay
1948–49	Servette FC	Grasshopper Club Zürich	3–0	
1949–50	Lausanne-Sport	Cantonal Neuchâtel	1–1	4–0 replay
1950–51	FC La Chaux-de-Fonds	FC Locarno	3–2	
1951–52	Grasshopper Club Zürich	FC Lugano	2–0	
1952–53	Young Boys	Grasshopper Club Zürich	1–1	3–1 replay
1953–54	FC La Chaux-de-Fonds	FC Fribourg	2–0	
1954–55	FC La Chaux-de-Fonds	FC Thun	3–1	
1955–56	Grasshopper Club Zürich	Young Boys	1–0	
1956–57	FC La Chaux-de-Fonds	Lausanne-Sport	3–1	
1957–58	Young Boys	Grasshopper Club Zürich	1–1	4–1 replay
1958–59	FC Grenchen	Servette FC	1–0	
1959–60	FC Luzern	FC Grenchen	1–0	
1960–61	FC La Chaux-de-Fonds	FC Biel	1–0	
1961–62	Lausanne-Sport	AC Bellinzona	4–0	(a.e.t.)
1962–63	FC Basel	Grasshopper Club Zürich	2–0	
1963–64	Lausanne-Sport	FC La Chaux-de-Fonds	2–0	
1964–65	FC Sion	Servette FC	2–1	
1965–66	FC Zürich	Servette FC	2–0	
1966–67	FC Basel	Lausanne-Sport	2–1	3–0 W/O, Lausanne walked off.
1967–68	FC Lugano	FC Winterthur	2–1	
1968–69	FC St. Gallen	AC Bellinzona	2–0	
1969–70	FC Zürich	FC Basel	4–1	(a.e.t.)
1970–71	Servette FC	FC Lugano	2–0	
1971–72	FC Zürich	FC Basel	1–0	
1972–73	FC Zürich	FC Basel	2–0	(a.e.t.)
1973–74	FC Sion	Neuchâtel Xamax	3–2	
1974–75	FC Basel	FC Winterthur	2–1	(a.e.t.)
1975–76	FC Zürich	Servette FC	1–0	
1976–77	Young Boys	FC St. Gallen	1–0	
1977–78	Servette FC	Grasshopper Club Zürich	2–2	1–0 replay
1978–79	Servette FC	Young Boys	1–1	3–2 replay
1979–80	FC Sion	Young Boys	2–1	
1980–81	Lausanne-Sport	FC Zürich	4–3	(a.e.t.)
1981–82	FC Sion	FC Basel	1–0	
1982–83	Grasshopper Club Zürich	Servette FC	2–2	3–0 replay
1983–84	Servette FC	Lausanne-Sport	1–0	(a.e.t.)
1984–85	FC Aarau	Neuchâtel Xamax	1–0	
1985–86	FC Sion	Servette FC	3–1	
1986–87	Young Boys	Servette FC	4–2	(a.e.t.)
1987–88	Grasshopper Club Zürich	FC Schaffhausen	2–0	
1988–89	Grasshopper Club Zürich	FC Aarau	2–1	
1989–90	Grasshopper Club Zürich	Neuchâtel Xamax	2–1	
1990–91	FC Sion	Young Boys	3–2	
1991–92	FC Luzern	FC Lugano	3–1	(a.e.t.)
1992–93	FC Lugano	Grasshopper Club Zürich	4–1	
1993–94	Grasshopper Club Zürich	FC Schaffhausen	4–0	
1994–95	FC Sion	Grasshopper Club Zürich	4–2	
1995–96	FC Sion	Servette FC	4–2	
1996–97	FC Sion	FC Luzern	3–3	(a.e.t.), (5–4 p)
1997–98	Lausanne-Sport	FC St. Gallen	2–2	(a.e.t.), (4–3 p)
1998–99	Lausanne-Sport	Grasshopper Club Zürich	2–0	
1999–2000	FC Zürich	Lausanne-Sport	2–2	(a.e.t.), (3–0 p)
2000–01	Servette FC	Yverdon-Sport FC	3–0	
2001–02	FC Basel	Grasshopper Club Zürich	2–1	(a.e.t.)
2002–03	FC Basel	Neuchâtel Xamax	6–0	
2003–04	FC Wil	Grasshopper Club Zürich	3–2	
2004–05	FC Zürich	FC Luzern	3–1	
2005–06	FC Sion	Young Boys	1–1	(a.e.t.), (5–3 p)
2006–07	FC Basel	FC Luzern	1–0	
2007–08	FC Basel	AC Bellinzona	4–1	
2008–09	FC Sion	Young Boys	3–2	
2009–10	FC Basel	FC Lausanne-Sport	6–0	
2010–11	FC Sion	Neuchâtel Xamax	2–0	
2011–12	FC Basel	FC Luzern	1–1	(a.e.t.), (4–2 p)
2012–13	Grasshopper Club Zürich	FC Basel	1–1	(a.e.t.), (4–3 p)
2013–14	FC Zürich	FC Basel	2–0	(a.e.t.)
2014–15	FC Sion	FC Basel	3–0	
2015–16	FC Zürich	FC Lugano	1–0	
2016–17	FC Basel	FC Sion	3–0	
2017–18	FC Zürich	Young Boys	2–1	
2018–19	FC Basel	FC Thun	2–1	
2019–20	Young Boys	FC Basel	2–1	
2020–21	FC Luzern	FC St. Gallen	3–1	
2021–22	FC Lugano	FC St. Gallen	4–1	
2022–23	Young Boys	FC Lugano	3–2	
2023–24	Servette FC	FC Lugano	0–0	(a.e.t.), (9–8 p)
2024–25	FC Basel	FC Biel-Bienne	4–1	
2025–26	FC St. Gallen	Stade Lausanne Ouchy	3–0	

=== Performance by clubs ===
Years in bold indicate a domestic double.

Club	Winners	Runners-up	Doubles	Winning years
Grasshopper Club Zürich	19	13	8	1925–26, **1926–27**, 1931–32, 1933–34, **1936–37**, 1937–38, 1939–40, 1940–41, **1941–42**, **1942–43**, 1945–46, **1951–52**, **1955–56**, **1982–83**, 1987–88, 1988–89, **1989–90**, 1993–94, 2012–13
FC Basel	14	10	7	1932–33, 1946–47, 1962–63, **1966–67**, 1974–75, **2001–02**, 2002–03, 2006–07, **2007–08**, **2009–10**, **2011–12**, **2016–17**, 2018–19, **2024–25**
FC Sion	13	1	1	1964–65, 1973–74, 1979–80, 1981–82, 1985–86, 1990–91, 1994–95, 1995–96, **1996–97**, 2005–06, 2008–09, 2010–11, 2014–15
FC Zürich	10	1	2	**1965–66**, 1969–70, 1971–72, 1972–73, **1975–76**, 1999–2000, 2004–05, 2013–14, 2015–16, 2017–18
Lausanne-Sport	9	8	2	**1934–35**, 1938–39, **1943–44**, 1949–50, 1961–62, 1963–64, 1980–81, 1997–98, 1998–99
Young Boys	8	8	3	1929–30, 1944–45, 1952–53, **1957–58**, 1976–77, 1986–87, **2019–20**, **2022–23**
Servette FC	8	12	1	1927–28, 1948–49, 1970–71, 1977–78, **1978–79**, 1983–84, 2000–01, 2023–24
FC La Chaux-de-Fonds	6	1	2	1947–48, 1950–51, **1953–54**, **1954–55**, 1956–57, 1960–61
FC Lugano	4	7	–	1930–31, 1967–68, 1992–93, 2021–22
FC Luzern	3	4	–	1959–60, 1991–92, 2020–21
FC St Gallen	2	5	–	1968–69, 2025–26
FC Grenchen	1	3	–	1958–59
FC Aarau	1	2	–	1984–85
Urania Genève Sport	1	1	–	1928–29
FC Young Fellows	1	1	–	1935–36
FC Wil	1	–	–	2003–04
Neuchâtel Xamax	–	5	–	–
AC Bellinzona	–	3	–	–
FC Nordstern	–	2	–	–
FC Schaffhausen	–	2	–	–
FC Winterthur	–	2	–	–
FC Thun	–	2	–	–
FC Biel-Bienne	–	2	–	–
FC Bern	–	1	–	–
FC Cantonal Neuchâtel	–	1	–	–
FC Fribourg	–	1	–	–
FC Locarno	–	1	–	–
Yverdon-Sport FC	–	1	–	–
Stade Lausanne Ouchy	–	1	–	–

== See also ==
- Swiss Football League
