= Marcel Vonlanthen =

Swiss footballer (born 1933)

Marcel Vonlanden
Personal information
- Date of birth: 8 September 1933 (age 93)
- Place of birth: Lausanne, Switzerland
- Position: Forward

Senior career*
Years	Team	Apps	(Gls)
- FC Lausanne-Sport

International career
- Switzerland
- * Club domestic league appearances and goals

Marcel Vonlanden (born 8 September 1933) is a Swiss football forward who played for Switzerland in the 1962 FIFA World Cup. He also played for FC Lausanne-Sport.
