= Charles Antenen =

Swiss footballer (1929–2000)

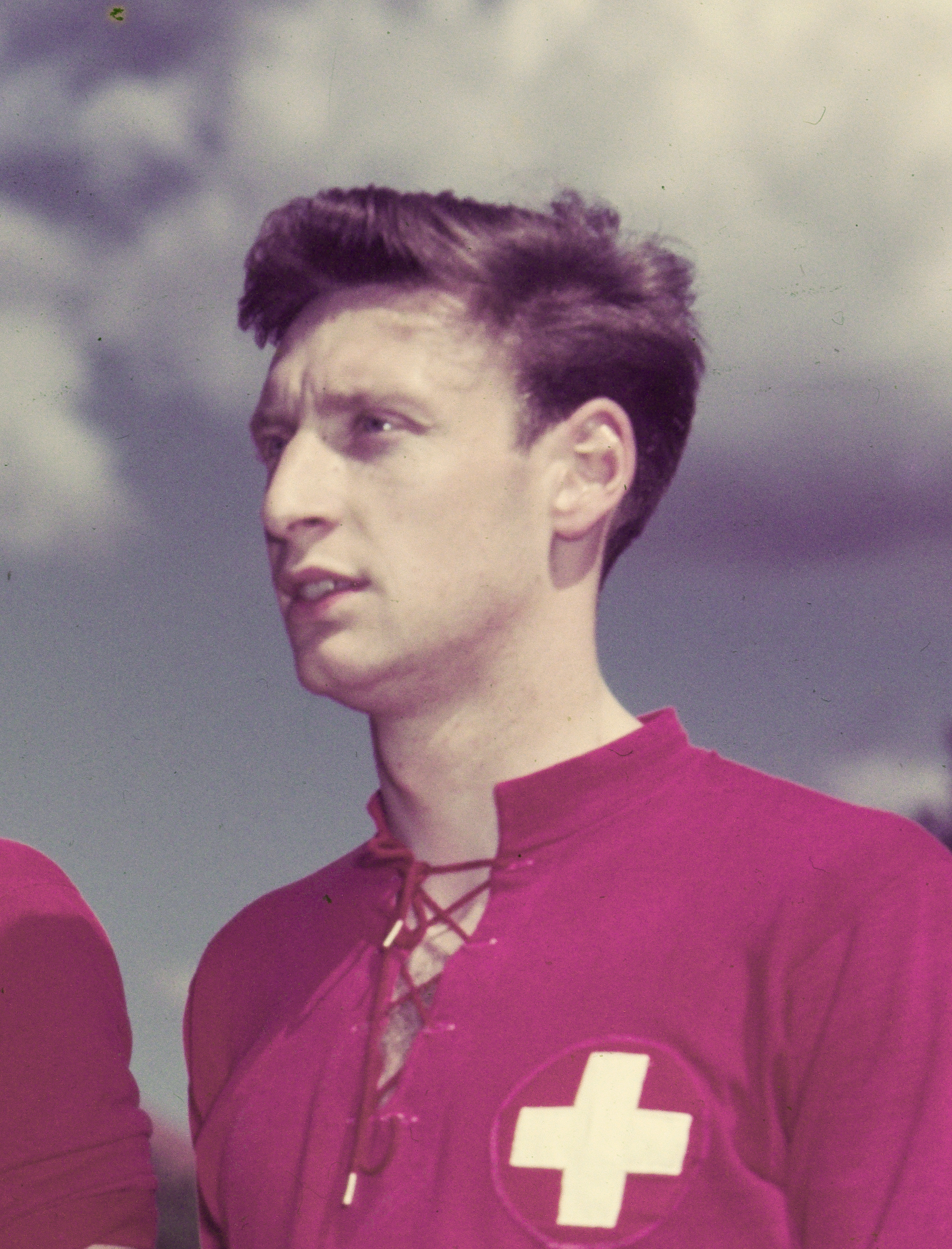
- Antenen in 1954

Personal information
- Date of birth: 3 November 1929
- Place of birth: La Chaux-de-Fonds, Switzerland
- Date of death: 20 May 2000 (aged 70)
- Place of death: Les Bayards, Switzerland
- Height: 1.74 m (5 ft 9 in)
- Position: Forward

Senior career*
Years	Team	Apps	(Gls)
1944–1952	La Chaux-de-Fonds	179	(110)
1952–1953	Lausanne Sport	24	(13)
1953–1965	La Chaux-de-Fonds	269	(128)
Total		472	(251)

International career
1948–1962	Switzerland	56	(22)
- * Club domestic league appearances and goals

Charles Antenen (3 November 1929 – 20 May 2000) was a Swiss football player, who was nicknamed Kiki.

== Career ==
Antenen played for La Chaux-de-Fonds from 1944 to 1952 and 1953–65, winning three Swiss championships and six Swiss Cups. He also played for Lausanne Sport from 1952 to 1953. For the Switzerland national team, he played 56 matches and scored 22 goals. He took part in three World Cups: 1950, 1954 and 1962. Prior to the 1962 FIFA World Cup, he participated in its qualification on 12 November 1961, scoring 1-1 against Sweden.

== Honours ==
- Swiss Champion: 1954, 1955, 1964
- Swiss Cup: 1948, 1951, 1954, 1955, 1957, 1961
