= FC La Chaux-de-Fonds =

Swiss football club

- Full name: Football Club La Chaux-de-Fonds
- Nickname: FCC
- Founded: 4 July 1894; 131 years ago
- Ground: Stade Charrière, La Chaux-de-Fonds, Switzerland
- Capacity: 12,700
- Manager: Joël Corminboeuf
- League: 1. Liga Classic
- 2024–25: Group 1, 13th of 16
Home colours	Away colours

FC La Chaux-de-Fonds is a Swiss football club based in La Chaux-de-Fonds, Switzerland. The club currently play in 1. Liga Classic, the fourth tier of Swiss football. It was founded on 4 July 1894 and used to play at the Stade Charrière.

== History ==
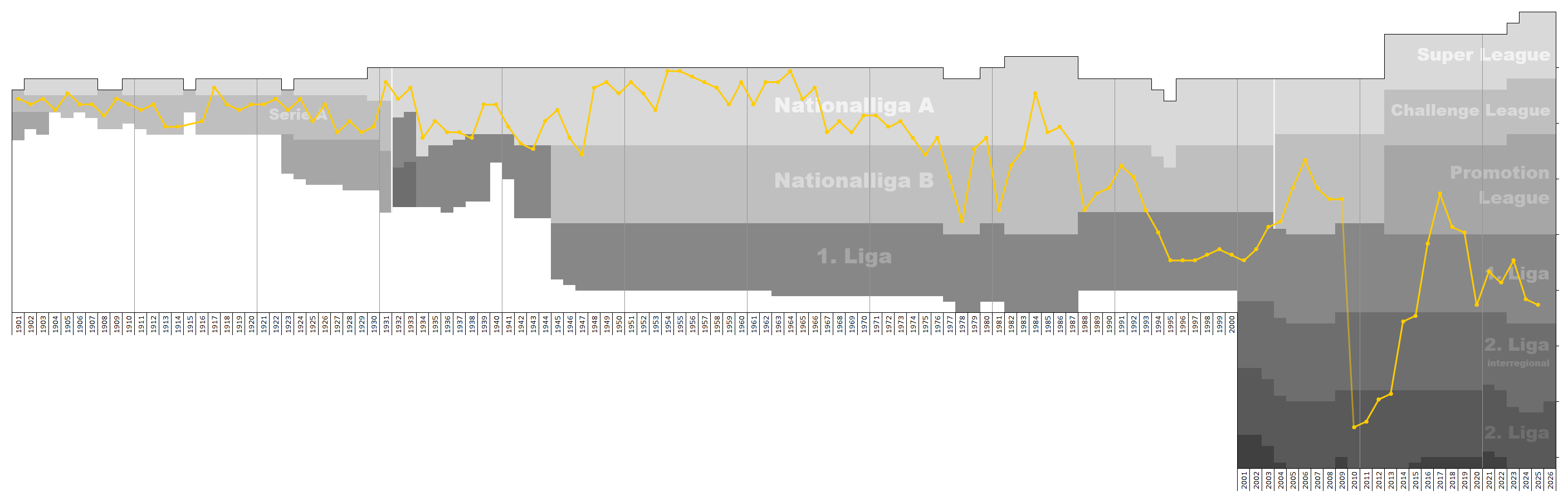
Chart of FC La Chaux-de-Fonds table positions in the Swiss football league system

The team has won the Swiss first division in seasons 1953–54, 1954–55, and 1963–64. Its most recent spell in the top division was in 1986–87. The team has also won the Swiss Cup in 1948, 1951, 1954, 1955, 1957, and 1961.

== Current squad ==
Note: Flags indicate national team as defined under FIFA eligibility rules; some limited exceptions apply. Players may hold more than one non-FIFA nationality.

No.	Pos.	Nation	Player
1	GK	SUI	Gilles Monti
4	DF	SUI	Maxime Meigniez
5	DF	SUI	Jordi Nzoao
6	MF	ESP	Ismael Martinez
7	MF	SUI	Vedad Efendic
8	MF	FRA	Amadou Diakhaté
9	FW	COD	Owe Bonyanga
10	MF	POR	Steve Coelho
12	MF	SUI	David Lokofe
13	FW	SUI	Isidore Cattin

No.	Pos.	Nation	Player
14	DF	TOG	Basile Ogouvide
15	DF	SUI	Lorik Berisha
16	MF	SUI	Kevin Dupuy
17	FW	FRA	Elhadj Diallo
18	FW	SUI	Jeffrey Kabuya
19	DF	SUI	Antony Salvador
20	MF	CMR	Frank Angong
21	DF	SUI	Luca De Piante
23	DF	FRA	Mattéo Cesca
30	GK	RWA	Hugo Bigirimana

== Stadium ==
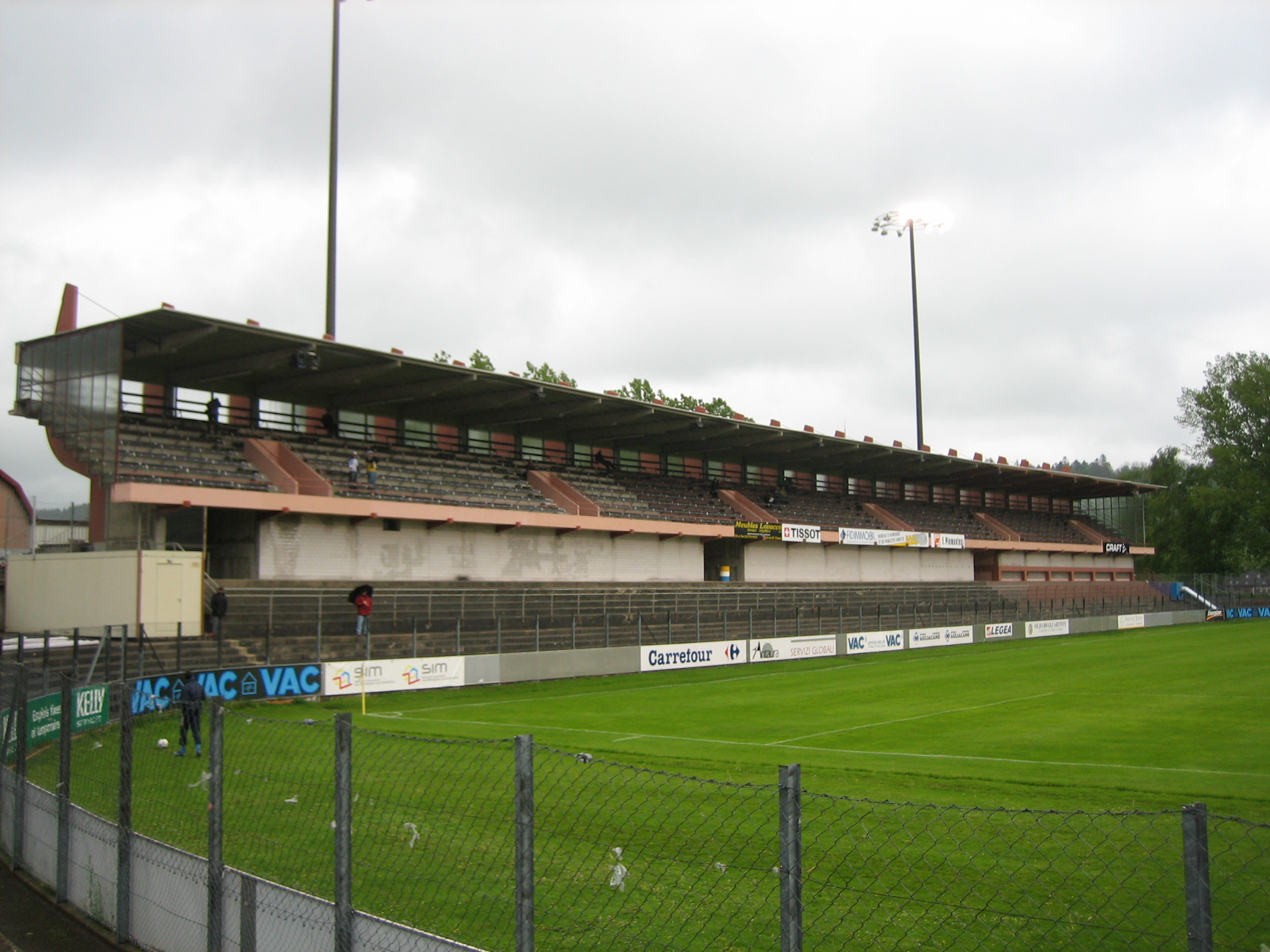
Centre Sportif de la Charrière stadium

FC La Chaux-de-Fonds's current stadium is the Centre Sportif de la Charrière, situated in La Chaux-de-Fonds.

== Honours ==
- Swiss Championship:
  - Winners (3): 1953–54, 1954–55, 1963–64
  - Runners-up (3): 1904–05, 1916–17, 1955–56
- Swiss Cup:
  - Winners (6): 1947–48, 1950–51, 1953–54, 1954–55, 1956–57, 1960–61
  - Runners-up (1): 1963–64
- 2. Liga Interregional Group 2:
  - Winners (1): 2014–15
