= Centre Sportif de la Charrière =

Multi-purpose stadium in La Chaux-de-Fonds, Switzerland

Coordinates: 47.111°N 6.836°E

Stade de la Charrière
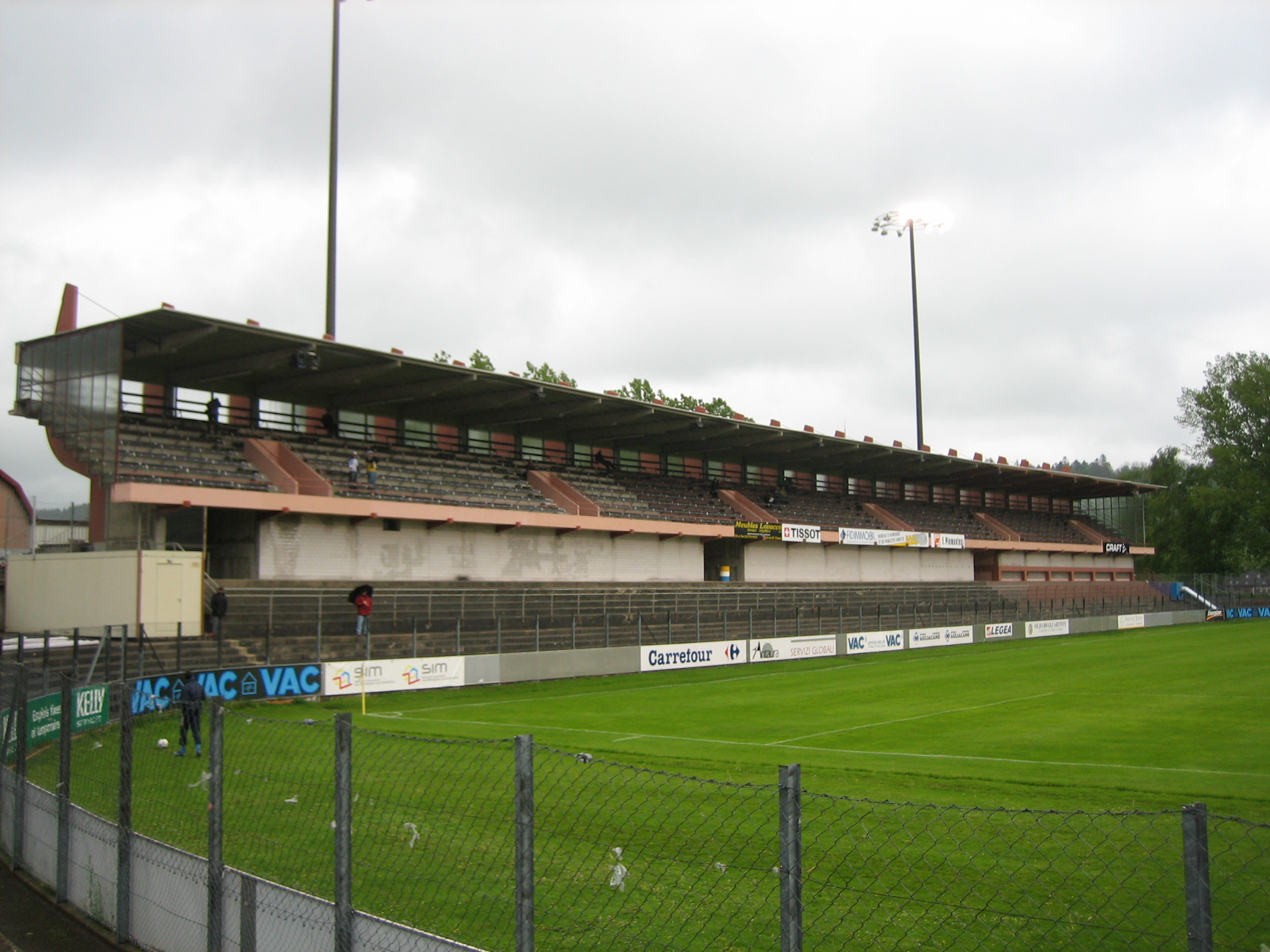
- Interactive map of Stade de la Charrière
- Location: La Chaux-de-Fonds, Switzerland
- Owner: Ville de la Chaux-de-Fonds
- Capacity: 2,500 (seats); 10,200 (standing), 12,700 (total)
- Surface: Grass
- Field size: 110 x 70 m

Tenant
- FC La Chaux-de-Fonds

Stade de la Charrière is a multi-purpose stadium in La Chaux-de-Fonds, Switzerland. It is currently used mostly for football matches and is the home ground of FC La Chaux-de-Fonds. The stadium has 2,500 seats and 10,200 standing places.

== See also ==
- List of football stadiums in Switzerland
