= FC Blue Stars Zürich =

Swiss football club

Blue Stars Zürich
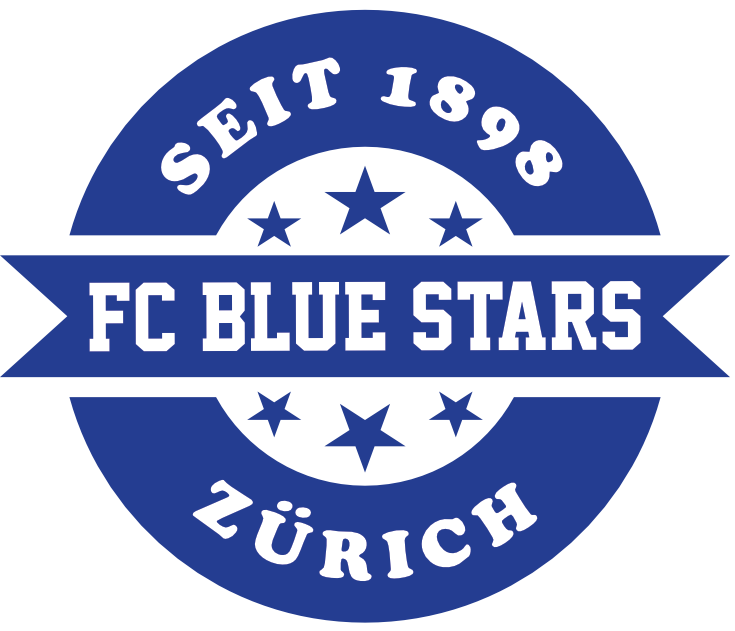
- Full name: Football Club Blue Stars Zürich
- Founded: 1898
- Ground: Hardhof
- Capacity: 2,000
- Chairman: Heinz Barmettler Sr.
- Coach: Federico D'Aloia
- League: 2. Liga
| Home colours | Away colours |

Football Club Blue Stars Zürich are a football team from Zürich, Switzerland. They are members of the Fussballverband Region Zürich, an under-section of the Swiss Football Association. The club have two men's teams and twelve youth teams. The first team currently play in the 3. Liga, the seventh tier in the Swiss football league system.

The club are the founders of the Blue Stars/FIFA Youth Cup. The Zürich based club were one of the first to have a separate youth section. This youth section expanded to include a tournament involving the best youth teams in the world. Recognising its importance to youth football, FIFA took over the tournament in 1991.
