= 1943–44 FC Basel season =

FC Basel
1943–44 season
- Chairman: Albert Besse
- First team coach: Willy Wolf
- Ground: Landhof, Basel
- 1943–44 Nationalliga: 9th
- Swiss Cup: Finalist
- Top goalscorer: League: Alfred Weisshaar (15); All: Alfred Weisshaar (18)
- Highest home attendance: 7,500 on 31 October 1943 vs Grasshopper Club
- Lowest home attendance: 2,500 on 20 February 1944 vs Luzern
- Average home league attendance: 4,369

The FC Basel 1943–44 season was the fifty-first season since the club's foundation on 15 November 1893. FC Basel played their home games in the Landhof in the district Wettstein in Kleinbasel. Albert Besse was the club's chairman for the fifth consecutive season.

== Overview ==
Team manager Eugen Rupf left the club following the last season and Willy Wolf was appointed as Basel's new team manager. Basel played 41 games in their 1943–44 season. 26 in the Nationalliga, five in the cup and ten were test games. They won 18, drew 11 and lost 12 times. In total, including the test games and the cup competition, they scored 83 goals and conceded 65.

There were 14 teams contesting in the 1943–44 Nationalliga. The team that finished in last position in the league table would be relegated. Basel played a mediocre season, winning nine matches, drawing eight and suffered nine defeats they ended the season with 26 points in 9th position. Lausanne-Sport won the Swiss championship, Luzern were relegated. Alfred Weisshaar was Basel's top league goal scorer with 15 goals, joint second league scorer with Alfred Bickel (Grasshopper Club) behind top scorer Erich Andres (Young Fellows Zürich) who netted 23 times.

In the Swiss Cup Basel started in the round of 32 with a home tie at the Landhof against lower tier local side Nordstern Basel. This was won 4–1. In the round of 16 they had a home tie and won 6–2 against St. Gallen. The quarter-final gave Basel another home tie and they won 5–1 against Young Boys. The semi-final was an away tie against Biel-Bienne. Hans Vonthron's goal was the only goal of the game and Basel qualified for the final. This was played on 10 April in Wankdorf Stadium in Bern against Lausanne-Sport. Two goals from Numa Monnard and one from Roger Courtois during the last five minutes of the match meant that Basel lost the game 0–3 and Lausanne won the national double.

== Players ==
Note: Flags indicate national team as defined under FIFA eligibility rules; some limited exceptions apply. Players may hold more than one non-FIFA nationality.

No.	Pos.	Nation	Player
—	GK	SUI	Kurt Imhof
—	GK	SUI	Ernst Kipfer
—	GK	SUI	Walter Müller
—	GK	SUI	Paul Wechlin
—	DF	SUI	Louis Favre
—	DF	SUI	Ernst Grauer
—	DF	SUI	Ernst Hufschmid
—	MF	SUI	Alexander Ebner
—	MF	SUI	Heinz Elsässer
—	MF	SUI	Rodolfo Kappenberger
—	MF	SUI	Alberto Losa
—	MF	SUI	Fritz Schmidlin

No.	Pos.	Nation	Player
—	MF	SUI	Guglielmo Spadini
—	MF	SUI	Tschüppeli
—	MF	SUI	Hans Vonthron
—	MF	SUI	Werner Wenk
—	MF	SUI	Rudolf Wirz
—	FW	SUI	Kurt Bertsch
—	FW	SUI	Max Gloor
—	FW	SUI	Rudolf Knup
—	FW	SUI	Alex Mathys (from Brühl St. Gallen)
—	FW	SUI	Hans Nyffeler
—	FW	SUI	Hans Rothen
—	FW	SUI	Hermann Suter
—	FW	SUI	Alfred Weisshaar

Players who left the squad

Note: Flags indicate national team as defined under FIFA eligibility rules; some limited exceptions apply. Players may hold more than one non-FIFA nationality.

No.	Pos.	Nation	Player
—	GK	SUI	Silvio Cinguetti
—	DF	SUI	Fritz Greder

No.	Pos.	Nation	Player
—	FW	SUI	Erich Andres (to Young Fellows Zürich)
—	FW	SUI	Eugen Rupf (to Grasshopper Club)
—	FW	SUI	Hans Spengler (to Zürich)

== Results ==
=== Legend ===
Win Draw Loss Postponed

=== Friendly matches ===
==== Pre- and mid-season ====
1 August 1943 Pre-season	Basel (Switzerland)	2–2	(Switzerland) SC Derendingen	Chur
	Bertsch 80' (1:2) (2:2)	Summary	(pen. 0:1) Steiner (0:2) Herzog

8 August 1943 Pre-season	Wettingen (Switzerland)	2–2	(Switzerland) Basel	Eggmann Zürich
	Egloff (1:0); Bürgler (2:1)	Summary	(1:1) (2:2)	Referee: (Switzerland) Hans Eggmann (Zürich)

15 August 1943 Pre-season	SC Derendingen (Switzerland)	1–1	(Switzerland) Basel	Heidenegg, Derendingen
	Bernhard (1:0)	Summary	(1:1) Bertsch

22 August 1943 Pre-season	Young Fellows Zürich (Switzerland)	0–1	(Switzerland) Basel	Letzigrund, Zürich
16:15		Summary	7' (0:1) Losa	Attendance: 1,000; Referee: (Switzerland) Theodor Ott (Oerlikon)

29 August 1943 Pre-season	La Chaux-de-Fonds (Switzerland)	3–2	(Switzerland) Basel	Stade Charrière, La Chaux-de-Fonds
14:30	Burger 1' (1:0); Perroud 7' (2:0); Burger 33' (3:1)	Summary	32' (2:1) Tschüppeli; 65' (3:2) Bertsch	Attendance: 2,800; Referee: (Switzerland) Adrien Sandoz (La Chaux-de-Fonds)

12 September 1943 Mid-season	Basel (Switzerland)	6–3	(Switzerland) Grasshopper Club	Landhof, Basel
15:00	Nyffeler; Hufschmid (pen.); Vonthron; Bertsch	Summary	Biedermann (pen.) Friedländer	Attendance: 2,800; Referee: (Switzerland) Paul von Wartburg (Bern)

==== Mid- to end of season ====
6 February 1944 Mid-season	Basel (Switzerland)	3–2	(Switzerland) Concordia Basel	Stadion Rankhof, Basel
15:00	Nyffeler 79' (1:2); Suter 81' (2:2); Gloor (3:2)	Summary	(0:1) Holderegger; 49' (0:2) Urfer	Attendance: 800; Referee: (Switzerland) Hans Vogt Schweizerhalle

18 March 1944 Mid-season	Nordstern Basel/Concordia Basel (Switzerland)	3–4	(Switzerland) Basel	Basel
	Goal	Summary	(1x) Ebner (1x) Tschüppeli (2x) Weisshaar

1 July 1944 End of season	Lausanne-Sport (Switzerland)	2–3	(Switzerland) Basel	Olympique de la Pontaise, Lausanne
17:00	Peruchoud 8' (1:2); Peruchoud 37' (2:3)	Summary	6' (0:1) Weisshaar; 7' (0:2) Kappenberger; 18' (1:3) Schmidlin (I)	Attendance: 1,500; Referee: (Switzerland) Roger Rapin (Lausanne)

2 July 1944 End of season	Lugano (Switzerland)	2–1	(Switzerland) Basel	Olympique de la Pontaise, Lausanne
17:00	Albizzati 50' (1:0); Albizzati 63' (2:0)	Summary	70' (2:1) Kappenberger	Attendance: 3,000; Referee: (Switzerland) Roger Rapin (Lausanne)

=== Nationalliga ===
==== League matches ====
5 September 1943 Round 1	Luzern	1–1	Basel	Stadion Allmend, Luzern
	Müller (1:1)	Summary	44' (0:1) Bertsch	Attendance: 1,600; Referee: (Switzerland) Sally Rosenbaum (Zürich/St. Gallen)

September 1943 Round 2	Basel	P–P	Grasshopper Club	Landhof, Basel
		[ Summary]

26 September 1943 Round 3	Lausanne-Sport	4–1	Basel	Olympique de la Pontaise, Lausanne
15:30	Eggimann 2' (1:0); Monnard 5' (2:0); Maillard (II) 25' (3:1); Courtois 30' (4:1)	Summary	6' (2:1) Nyffeler	Attendance: 2,500; Referee: (Switzerland) Adrien Sandoz (La Chaux-de-Fonds)

3 October 1943 Round 4	Basel	2–0	Biel-Bienne	Landhof, Basel
15:00	Kappenberger 73' (1:0); Suter 86' (pen. 2:0)	Summary		Attendance: 3,500; Referee: (Switzerland) Josef Schürch (Winterthur)

17 October 1943 Round 5	Cantonal Neuchatel	2–0	Basel	Stade de la Maladière, Neuchâtel
15:00	Sydler 47' (1:0); Sydler (2:0)	Summary		Attendance: 3,500; Referee: (Switzerland) Sally Rosenbaum (Zürich/St. Gallen)

24 October 1943 Round 6	Servette	1–1	Basel	Charmilles Stadium, Geneva
15:15	Tamini 78' (1:0)	Summary	80' (1:1) Weisshaar	Attendance: 4,000; Referee: (Switzerland) Ernst Jaggi (Bern)

31 October 1943 Round 2	Basel	2–1	Grasshopper Club	Landhof, Basel
15:00	Ebner 49' (1:0); Weisshaar 59' (2:0)	Summary	75 pen. 2:1' Bickel	Attendance: 7,500; Referee: (Switzerland) Paul von Wartburg (Bern)

7 November 1943 Round 7	Basel	1–1	Young Boys	Landhof, Basel
14:30	Vonthron 85' (1:1)	Summary	20' (0:1) Bernhard	Attendance: 3,500; Referee: (Switzerland) Adrien Sandoz (La Chaux-de-Fonds)

14 November 1943 Round 8	Young Fellows Zürich	1–3	Basel	Letzigrund, Zürich
13:00	Nausch (1:2)	Summary	63' (0:1) Weisshaar; 73' (0:2) Weisshaar (1:3) Suter	Attendance: 3,500; Referee: (Switzerland) Marco Grassi (Balerna)
Note: 88' Heinz Elsässer is carried out due to an injury, broken leg.

21 November 1943 Round 9	Basel	3–0	Zürich	Landhof, Basel
14:30	Ebner 5' (1:0); Weisshaar 15' (2:0); Weisshaar 46' (3:0)	Summary		Attendance: 3,000; Referee: (Switzerland) Louis Tschopp (Delémont)
Note: Anniversary game 50 years of FC Basel.

28 November 1943 Round 10	Grenchen	4–1	Basel	Stadion Brühl, Grenchen
	Ducommun 5' (1:0); Rougemont 15' (2:0); Neuhaus 55' (3:0); Rougemont 90' (4:1)	Summary	62' (3:1) Vonthron	Referee: (Switzerland) Josef Schürch (Winterthur)

5 December 1943 Round 11	Basel	1–1	La Chaux-de-Fonds	Landhof, Basel
14:30	Suter 82' (pen. 1:1)	Summary	30' (0:1) A. Abegglen; (red card) 82' Jaeck	Attendance: 5,000; Referee: (Switzerland) Sally Rosenbaum (Zürich/St. Gallen)

12 December 1943 Round 12	St. Gallen	2–1	Basel	Espenmoos, St. Gallen
	Wagner (1:1); Wagner 78' (2:1)	Summary	(0:1) Ebner	Attendance: 1,500; Referee: (Switzerland) Hans Eggmann (Zürich)

19 December 1943 Round 13	Basel	0–0	Lugano	Landhof, Basel
14:30		Summary		Attendance: 5,000; Referee: (Switzerland) Georges Craviolini (Chippis)

2 February 1944 Round 14	Basel	1–1	Luzern	Landhof, Basel
15:00	Suter 62' (1:0)	Summary	76' (1:1) Irniger	Attendance: 2,500; Referee: (Switzerland) Mario Grassi (Balerna)

February 1944 Round 15	Grasshopper Club	P–P	Basel	Hardturm, Zürich
		[ Summary]

5 March 1944 Round 16	Basel	2–1	Lausanne-Sport	Landhof, Basel
15:00	Weisshaar 21' (1:0); Suter (2:0)	Summary	58' (2:1) Eggimann	Attendance: 4,000; Referee: (Switzerland) Paul von Wartburg Bern

19 March 1944 Round 17	Biel-Bienne	2–0	Basel	Gurzelen Stadion, Biel/Bienne
	Graber 16' (1:0); Weibel 85' (2:0)	Summary		Attendance: 2,300; Referee: (Switzerland) Hans Wüthrich (Bern)

2 April 1944 Round 18	Basel	1–1	Cantonal Neuchatel	Landhof, Basel
15:00	Weisshaar 70' (1:1)	Summary	63' (0:1) Facchinetti	Attendance: 4,800; Referee: (Switzerland) Eugen Scherz (Bern)
Note: From 78' Basel with only 10 men due to injury of Suter

16 April 1944 Round 15	Grasshopper Club	1–2	Basel	Hardturm, Zürich
15:45	Amadò 30' (1:0)	Summary	35' (1:1) Bertsch; 36' (1:2) Weisshaar	Attendance: 4,500; Referee: (Switzerland) Ernst Jaggi (Bern)

23 April 1944 Round 19	Basel	1–1	Servette	Landhof, Basel
15:00	Kappenberger (1:1)	Summary	(0:1) Bachasse	Attendance: 6,000; Referee: (Switzerland) Emil Heiniger (Bern)

30 April 1944 Round 20	Young Boys	0–3	Basel	Wankdorf Stadium, Bern
		Summary	12' (0:1) Hufschmid; 74' (0:2) Kappenberger; 77' (0:3) Weisshaar	Attendance: 3,500; Referee: (Switzerland) Jean Lutz (Geneva)

7 May 1944 Round 21	Basel	2–0	Young Fellows Zürich	Landhof, Basel
15:00	Hufschmid 56' (1:0); Ebner (2:0)	Summary		Attendance: 4,500; Referee: (Switzerland) Rodolphe Wittwer (Geneva)

14 May 1944 Round 22	Zürich	4–3	Basel	Letzigrund, Zürich
14:15	Hagenlocher (pen. 1:1); Nyffeler (pen. 2:3); Hagenlocher (3:3); Busenhardt 80' (4:3)	Summary	(0:1) Kappenberger; 43' (1:2) Ebner (1:3) Weisshaar	Attendance: 4,000; Referee: (Switzerland) Eugen Scherz (Bern)

21 May 1944 Round 23	Basel	2–3	Grenchen	Landhof, Basel
15:00	Ebner 14' (1:1); Hufschmid 22' (2:1)	Summary	2' (pen. 0:1) Righetti; 63' (2:2) Courtat (2:3) Courtat	Attendance: 4,000; Referee: (Switzerland) Mario Grassi (Balerna)

4 June 1944 Round 24	La Chaux-de-Fonds	3–1	Basel	Stade Charrière, La Chaux-de-Fonds
15:00	Perroud (1:1); Perroud (2:1); Neury (3:1)	Summary	25' (0:1) Weisshaar	Attendance: 1,500; Referee: (Switzerland) Sally Rosenbaum (Zürich/St. Gallen)

11 June 1944 Round 25	Basel	6–1	St. Gallen	Landhof, Basel
15:00	Hufschmid 15' (1:0); Weisshaar (2:0); Weisshaar (3:0); Schmidlin (I) (4:0); Weisshaar 34' (5:0); Gloor (6:1)	Summary	(5:1) Deriaz	Attendance: 3,500; Referee: (Switzerland) Armand Merlotti (Neuchâtel)

17 June 1944 Round 26	Lugano	2–1	Basel	Campo Marzio, Lugano
	Bernasconi 42' (1:1); Albizatti 55' (2:1)	Summary	24' (0:1) Gloor	Referee: (Switzerland) Eugen Scherz (Bern)

==== League table ====
Pos	Team	Pld	W	D	L	GF	GA	GD	Pts	Qualification
1	Lausanne-Sport	26	17	4	5	48	25	+23	38	Champions and Swiss Cup winners
2	Servette	26	12	8	6	39	25	+14	32	
3	Lugano	26	12	6	8	47	32	+15	30	
4	Grasshopper Club	26	13	3	10	54	32	+22	29	
5	Biel-Bienne	26	12	5	9	42	30	+12	29	
6	Young Boys	26	9	11	6	38	32	+6	29	
7	Cantonal Neuchatel	26	10	8	8	38	27	+11	28	
8	Grenchen	26	12	4	10	45	41	+4	28	
9	Basel	26	9	8	9	42	38	+4	26	
10	La Chaux-de-Fonds	26	10	6	10	34	45	−11	26	
11	Young Fellows Zürich	26	9	3	14	46	51	−5	21	
12	St. Gallen	26	8	3	15	26	60	−34	19	
13	Zürich	26	6	5	15	37	54	−17	17	
14	Luzern	26	4	4	18	19	63	−44	12	Relegated

Source: rsssf.com

=== Swiss Cup ===
26 December 1943 Round of 32	Basel	4–1	Nordstern Basel	Landhof, Basel
14:00	Suter 21' (1:0); Bertsch 32' (2:0); Suter 77' (pen. 3:1); Hufschmid (4:1)	FCB summary	56' (2:1) Wiesner	Attendance: 4,000; Referee: (Switzerland) Josef Schürch (Winterthur)
Note: Nordstern played the 1943/44 season in the 1. Liga (second tier).

9 January 1944 Round of 16	Basel	6–2	St. Gallen	Landhof, Basel
14:00	Ebner 10' (1:0); Bertsch 22' (2:0); Ebner 44' (3:0); Ebner 56' (4:1); Suter 66' (pen. 5:1); Ebner 75' (6:1)	FCB summary	52' (o.g. 3:1); (red card) 66' Schenker; 52' (6:2) Wagner	Attendance: 3,000; Referee: (Switzerland) Jean Lutz (Geneva)

13 February 1944 Quarter-final	Basel	5–1	Young Boys	Landhof, Basel
14:30	Weisshaar 26' (1:1); Vonthron 32' (2:1); Weisshaar (3:1); Weisshaar 79' (4:1); Kappenberger 81' (5:1)	FCB summary	17' (0:1) Bernhard	Attendance: 3,500; Referee: (Switzerland) Widmer (Geneva)

12 March 1944 Semi-final	Biel-Bienne	0–1	Basel	Hardturm, Zürich
15:00		FCB summary	67' (0:1) Vonthron	Attendance: 4,000; Referee: (Switzerland) Marco Grassi (Bellinzona)
Note: For their own benefit Biel decided to play in Zurich. From 75' Biel down to ten players due to injury.

10 April 1944 Final	Lausanne-Sport	3–0	Basel	Wankdorf Stadium, Bern
15:00	Monnard 85' (1:0); Courtois 88' (2:0); Monnard 90' (3:0)	Fussball-Schweiz summary FCB summary		Attendance: 15,000; Referee: (Switzerland) Hans Wüthrich (Bern)
Note: Lausanne-Sport won the cup and this was the club's third cup title to this date. Six weeks later the team also won the domestic league therefore they secured themselves the double and this was the second time that they won the double.

== See also ==
- History of FC Basel
- List of FC Basel players
- List of FC Basel seasons

== Sources ==
- Rotblau: Jahrbuch Saison 2014/2015. Publisher: FC Basel Marketing AG. ISBN 978-3-7245-2027-6
- Die ersten 125 Jahre. Publisher: Josef Zindel im Friedrich Reinhardt Verlag, Basel. ISBN 978-3-7245-2305-5
- FCB team 1943/44 at fcb-archiv.ch
- Switzerland 1943/44 by Erik Garin at Rec.Sport.Soccer Statistics Foundation
