= 1944–45 FC Basel season =

FC Basel
1944–45 season
- Chairman: Emil Junker
- First team coach: Max Barras
- Ground: Landhof, Basel
- 1944–45 Nationalliga A: 13th
- Swiss Cup: Round of 16
- Top goalscorer: League: René Bader (11); All: René Bader (14)
- Highest home attendance: 6,000 on 12 November 1944 vs Lausanne-Sport and on 17 December 1944 vs Cantonal Neuchatel
- Lowest home attendance: 3,500 on 26 November 1944 vs St. Gallen
- Average home league attendance: 4,753

The FC Basel 1944–45 season was the fifty-second season since the club's foundation on 15 November 1893. FC Basel played their home games in the Landhof in the district Wettstein in Kleinbasel. Emil Junker was the club's new chairman. He took over from Albert Besse following the AGM on 8 July 1944.

== Overview ==
Max Barras was appointed as new first team manager. Basel played 43 games in their 1944–45 season. 28 in the Nationalliga (including two replayed games), three in the Swiss Cup and 12 were test games. They won 14, drew 10 and lost 19 times. In total, including the test games and the cup competition, they scored 86 goals and conceded 82. René Bader was the best scorer with 14 goals, Willy Monigatti second best with 13.

There were 14 teams contesting in the 1944–45 Nationalliga A. The two teams that finished in last and second last position in the league table would be relegated. Basel played a bad season, winning just six matches, drawing six and they suffered 14 defeats, thus they ended the season with 18 points in 13th position, second last. Two of the games during the season were played under protest and were later replayed. These were the games on 24 September 1944 against Lugano and on 29 April 1945 against Grenchen. The protest was because Basel could not field their best teams due to the military duties of their players. Both replayed games ended with a defeat. Grasshopper Club won the Swiss championship, Basel and St. Gallen were relegated. René Bader was the best league goal scorer with 11 goals and Willy Monigatti second best with 9 league goals.

In the Swiss Cup Basel started in the 3rd principal round with an away tie against lower tier local side FC Allschwil and a 6–0 victory. In the round of 32 Basel had a home game at the Landhof against lower tier SC Zofingen which ended with a 3–1 win. In the round of 16 Basel travelled to an away game against St. Gallen and were knocked out of the competition.

== Players ==
Note: Flags indicate national team as defined under FIFA eligibility rules; some limited exceptions apply. Players may hold more than one non-FIFA nationality.

No.	Pos.	Nation	Player
—	GK	SUI	H. Müller
—	GK	SUI	Walter Müller
—	GK	SUI	Paul Wechlin
—	DF	SUI	Werner Bopp
—	DF	SUI	Louis Favre
—	DF	SUI	Ernst Grauer
—	DF	SUI	Ernst Hufschmid
—	MF	SUI	Alexander Ebner
—	MF	SUI	Heinz Elsässer
—	MF	SUI	Rodolfo Kappenberger
—	MF	SUI	Alberto Losa
—	MF	SUI	Willy Monigatti
—	MF	SUI	Traugott Oberer

No.	Pos.	Nation	Player
—	MF	SUI	Fritz Schmidlin
—	MF	SUI	Guglielmo Spadini
—	MF	SUI	Tschüppeli
—	MF	SUI	Hans Vonthron
—	MF	SUI	Werner Wenk
—	MF	SUI	Willy Zingg
—	FW	SUI	René Bader
—	FW	SUI	Kurt Bertsch
—	FW	SUI	Max Gloor
—	FW	SUI	Alex Mathys (from Brühl St. Gallen)
—	FW	SUI	Hans Nyffeler
—	FW	SUI	Hermann Suter
—	FW	SUI	Alfred Weisshaar

Players who left the squad

Note: Flags indicate national team as defined under FIFA eligibility rules; some limited exceptions apply. Players may hold more than one non-FIFA nationality.

No.	Pos.	Nation	Player
—	GK	SUI	Kurt Imhof
—	GK	SUI	Ernst Kipfer

No.	Pos.	Nation	Player
—	MF	SUI	Rudolf Wirz
—	FW	SUI	Rudolf Knup
—	FW	SUI	Hans Rothen

== Results ==
=== Legend ===
Win Draw Loss Postponed

=== Friendly matches ===
==== Pre- and mid-season ====
12 August 1944 Pre-season	Old Boys (Switzerland)	0–7	(Switzerland) Basel	Basel
		Summary	Goal

20 August 1944 Pre-season	Luzern (Switzerland)	1–3	(Switzerland) Basel	Stadion Allmend, Luzern
	Hug (1:2)	Summary	(0:1) Bertsch (0:2) Gloor	Attendance: 400; Referee: (Switzerland) Allgöwer Luzern

27 August 1944 Pre-season	Basel (Switzerland)	1–1	(Switzerland) Nordstern Basel	Stadion Schützenmatte, Basel
16:45	Weisshaar 30' (1:1)	Summary	53' (1:1) Scholl

10 September 1944 Pre-season	Basel (Switzerland)	0–0	(Switzerland) St. Gallen	Landhof, Basel
15:00		Summary		Attendance: 1,000; Referee: (Switzerland) Hans Vogt Schweizerhalle

16 September 1944 Pre-season	Basel (Switzerland)	5–0	(Switzerland) Cantonal Neuchatel	Landhof, Basel
16:00	Nyffeler 6' (1:0); Nyffeler (2:0); Nyffeler 30' (3:0); Oberer (4:0); Ebner (5:0)	Summary		Attendance: 1,000; Referee: (Switzerland) Hans Vogt Schweizerhalle

==== Winter break to end of season ====
14 January 1945 Winter break	Basel (Switzerland)	6–1	(Switzerland) Concordia Basel/SC Kleinhüningen	Landhof, Basel
14:30	Oberer (1:0); Oberer (2:0); Oberer (3:0); Kappenberger (4:1); Monigatti (5:1); Monigatti (6:1)	Summary	(3:1) Eckert	Attendance: 800; Referee: (Switzerland) Sannwald Sissach

11 February 1945 Winter break	Basel (Switzerland)	2–4	(Switzerland) Grenchen	Landhof, Basel
14:30	Grauer 10' (1:0); Suter (2:4)	Summary	19' (1:1) Righetti (I); 21' (1:2) Courtat (1:3) Courtat; 51' (1:4) Courtat	Attendance: 1,200; Referee: (Switzerland) Traub Basel

18 February 1945 Winter break	Basel (Switzerland)	0–2	(Switzerland) Nordstern Basel	Landhof, Basel
15:00		Summary	10' (0:1) Scholl (0:2) Scholl	Attendance: 1,500; Referee: (Switzerland) Häring Basel

25 February 1945 Winter break	Basel (Switzerland)	1–1	(Switzerland) Zürich	Landhof, Basel
15:00	Tschüppeli 28' (1:0)	Summary	52' (1:1) Hirt	Attendance: 2,500; Referee: (Switzerland) Sannwald Sissach

4 March 1945 Winter break	Aarau (Switzerland)	2–1	(Switzerland) Basel	Stadion Brügglifeld, Aarau
	Hofer 21' (1:0); Taddei 85' (2:1)	Summary	(1:1) Oberer	Attendance: 1,000; Referee: (Switzerland) Ott Baden

11 March 1945 Winter break	Basel (Switzerland)	3–2	(Italy) Italian Internee Team	Landhof, Basel
14:00	Monigatti 30' (1:0); Monigatti 50' (2:0); Kappenberger 71' (3:1)	Summary	(2:1) (pen. 3:2)	Attendance: 3,000; Referee: (Switzerland) Hans Vogt Schweizerhlle

8 April 1945 Mid-season	Basel (Switzerland)	3–1	(Poland) Polish Internee Team	Landhof, Basel
15:00	Schmidlin (I) 13' (1:0) (o.g. 2:0); Bader 72' (3:0)	Summary	74' (3:1)	Attendance: 2,000; Referee: (Switzerland) Häring Basel

=== Nationalliga ===
==== League matches ====
September 1944 Round 1	Basel	Postponed	Lausanne-Sport	Landhof, Basel
		[ Summary]

24 September 1944 Round 2	Lugano	3–0 (Note: Replay July 8, 1945)	Basel	Campo Marzio, Lugano
	Galli 6' (1:0); Andreoli 54' (2:0); Montorfani (III) 55' (pen. 3:0)	Summary		Attendance: 2,000; Referee: (Switzerland) E. Heiniger Bern

1 October 1944 Round 3	Basel	3–3	Grasshopper Club	Landhof, Basel
15:00	Bertsch 17' (1:0); Ebner 58' (2:2); Hufschmid 77' (3:3)	Summary	18' (1:1) Friedländer; 26' (o.g. 1:2) Elsässer; 62' (2:3) Bickel	Attendance: 4,000; Referee: (Switzerland) Rapin Lausanne

8 October 1944 Round 4	Young Fellows Zürich	2–0	Basel	Hardturm, Zürich
14:22	Andres 14' (1:0); Fink 65' (2:0)	Summary		Attendance: 6,000; Referee: (Switzerland) Grassi Balerna

15 October 1944 Round 5	Basel	0–2	Grenchen	Landhof, Basel
15:00		Summary	Righetti (II) 13' (0:1); Righetti (I) 48' (0:2)	Attendance: 5,000; Referee: (Switzerland) Sandoz La Chaux-de-Fonds

22 October 1944 Round 6	La Chaux-de-Fonds	3–1	Basel	Stade Charrière, La Chaux-de-Fonds
15:00	Perroud 36' (1:1); Berthoud 56' (2:1); Van Gessel 77' (3:1)	Summary	6' (0:1) Kappenberger	Attendance: 2,500; Referee: (Switzerland) Rapin Lausanne

29 October 1944 Round 7	Servette	2–0	Basel	Charmilles Stadium, Geneva
15:00	Fatton 40' (1:0); Fatton 43' (2:0)	Summary		Attendance: 4,000; Referee: (Switzerland) Georges Craviolini Chippis

5 November 1944 Round 8	Basel	2–0	Bellinzona	Landhof, Basel
14:30	Bertsch (1:0); Bertsch (2:0)	Summary		Attendance: 5,000; Referee: (Switzerland) Merlotti Neuchâtel

12 November 1944 Round 1	Basel	2–3	Lausanne-Sport	Landhof, Basel
14:30	Bader 1' (1:0); Bertsch 27' (2:2)	Summary	(1:1) Eggimann; 7' (1:2) Eggimann; 70' (2:3) Courtois	Attendance: 6,000; Referee: (Switzerland) Niederhauser Bern

19 November 1944 Round 9	Zürich	4–1	Basel	Letzigrund, Zürich
14:30	Bosshard 30' (1:0); Bosshard (2:1); Bosshard 80' (3:1); Conte (4:1)	Summary	(pen. 1:1) Bader	Attendance: 3,500; Referee: (Switzerland) Tschopp Delémont

26 November 1944 Round 10	Basel	3–0	St. Gallen	Landhof, Basel
14:30	Kappenberger 28' (1:0); Suter 51' (2:0); Kappenberger 86' (3:0)	Summary		Attendance: 3,500; Referee: (Switzerland) von Wartburg Bern

10 December 1944 Round 11	Biel-Bienne	2–2	Basel	Gurzelen Stadion, Biel/Bienne
14:30	Weibel 38' (1:0); Ferioli 60' (2:1)	Summary	56' (1:1) Suter; 70' (2:2) Vonthron	Attendance: 2,200; Referee: (Switzerland) Lutz Geneva

17 December 1944 Round 12	Basel	0–4	Cantonal Neuchatel	Landhof, Basel
14:30		Summary	Sydler 12' (0:1); Sandoz 57' (0:2); Sydler 58' (0:3); Frangi 61' (0:4)	Attendance: 6,000; Referee: (Switzerland) Jaggi Bern

31 December 1944 Round 13	Young Boys	2–1	Basel	Wankdorf Stadium, Bern
14:30	Walaschek 30' (1:0); Trachsel 37' (2:0)	Summary	75' (2:1) Oberer	Attendance: 3,000; Referee: (Switzerland) Wittwer Geneva

18 March 1945 Round 14	Lausanne-Sport	2–0	Basel	Olympique de la Pontaise, Lausanne
15:00	Monnard 2' (1:0); Monnard (2:0)	Summary		Attendance: 4,500; Referee: (Switzerland) Iseli Biel/Bienne

25 March 1945 Round 15	Basel	4–4	Lugano	Landhof, Basel
15:00	Monigatti (1:2); Kappenberger 20' (2:3); Oberer (3:4); Schmidlin (I) (4:4)	Summary	1' (0:1) Montorfani; 10' (0:2) Bernasconi; 15' (1:3) Bernasconi (2:4) Fornara (II)	Attendance: 5,000; Referee: (Switzerland) Lutz Geneva

15 April 1945 Round 16	Grasshopper Club	6–4	Basel	Hardturm, Zürich
16:30	Küenzler (1:0); Friedländer (2:2); Friedländer (3:2); Küenzler (4:2); Bickel 76' (5:3); Biedermann 87' (6:4)	Summary	(1:1) Bader (1:2) Monigatti; 75' (4:3) Monigatti; 82' (5:4) Monigatti	Attendance: 6,000; Referee: (Switzerland) Niederhauser Bern

22 April 1945 Round 17	Basel	3–0	Young Fellows Zürich	Landhof, Basel
15:00	Bader (pen. 1:0); Bader 49' (2:0); Monigatti 75' (3:0)	Summary		Attendance: 4,000; Referee: (Switzerland) Wittwer Geneva

29 April 1945 Round 18	Grenchen	1–1 (Note: Replay July 14, 1945)	Basel	Stadion Brühl, Grenchen
	Brunner 75' (1:1)	Summary	4' (0:1) Bader	Attendance: 1,000; Referee: (Switzerland) Sally Rosenbaum Zürich/St. Gallen

6 May 1945 Round 19	Basel	2–1	La Chaux-de-Fonds	Landhof, Basel
16:00	Ebner (1:0); Bader 15' (2:0)	Summary	(o.g. 2:1) Grauer	Attendance: 5,000; Referee: (Switzerland) Merlotti Neuchâtel

13 May 1945 Round 20	Basel	3–1	Servette	Landhof, Basel
15:00	Monigatti 19' (1:0); Schmidlin (I) 40' (2:0); Monigatti 43' (3:0)	Summary	67' (3:1) Belli	Attendance: 4,800; Referee: (Switzerland) von Wartburg Bern

27 May 1945 Round 21	Bellinzona	0–0	Basel	Campo Granata, Bellinzona
		Summary		Attendance: 2,000; Referee: (Switzerland) DörflingerGrenchen

3 June 1945 Round 22	Basel	3–3	Zürich	Landhof, Basel
15:00	Monigatti (1:1); Bader 52' (pen. 2:1); Bader 83' (3:3)	Summary	35' (0:1) Bosshard; 63' (pen. 2:2) Minelli; 67' (2:3) Schneiter	Attendance: 4,500; Referee: (Switzerland) Niederhauser Bern

10 June 1945 Round 23	St. Gallen	2–2	Basel	Espenmoos, St. Gallen
	Luchsinger 43' (1:0); Wagner 65' (2:2)	Summary	(1:1) Oberer; 57' (1:2) Monigatti	Attendance: 3,000; Referee: (Switzerland) Jaggi Bern

17 June 1945 Round 24	Basel	3–1	Biel-Bienne	Landhof, Basel
16:30	Bader 7' (1:0); Wenk 84' (2:1); Grauer (pen. 3:1)	Summary	17' (pen. 1:1) Veeser	Attendance: 4,000; Referee: (Switzerland) Scherz Bern

24 June 1945 Round 25	Cantonal Neuchatel	3–0	Basel	Stade de la Maladière, Neuchâtel
15:00	Guillaume 80' (1:0); Franghi 81' (2:0); Hufschmid (o.g.)	Summary		Attendance: 1,400; Referee: (Switzerland) Sally Rosenbaum Zürich/St. Gallen

1 July 1945 Round 26	Basel	3–4	Young Boys	Landhof, Basel
15:30	Vonthron (1:3); Bader 80' (2:4); Vonthron (pen. 3:4)	Summary	16' (0:1) Knecht; 30' (0:2) Bernhard; 62' (0:3) Walaschek; 67' (1:4) Streun	Attendance: 5,000; Referee: (Switzerland) DörflingerGrenchen

==== League matches Replays ====
8 July 1945 Round 2	Lugano	4–3	Basel	Campo Marzio, Lugano
	Bergamini 50' (1:1); Bergamini 62' (2:1); Montorfani 67' (3:1); Fornara (II) 69' (4:1)	Summary	17' (0:1) Wenk (4:2) Wenk (4:3) Hufschmid	Attendance: 1,000; Referee: (Switzerland) von Wartburg Bern

15 July 1945 Round 18	Grenchen	1–0	Basel	Stadion Brühl, Grenchen
18:00	Zadra 28' (1:0)	Summary		Attendance: 800; Referee: (Switzerland) Schürch Winterthur

==== League table ====
Pos	Team	Pld	W	D	L	GF	GA	GD	Pts	Relegation
1	Grasshopper Club Zürich	26	18	5	3	78	39	+39	41	Swiss Champions
2	FC Lugano	26	15	4	7	55	36	+19	34	
3	BSC Young Boys	26	13	8	5	37	30	+7	34	Swiss Cup winners
4	FC Grenchen	26	13	7	6	37	29	+8	33	
5	Lausanne Sports	26	15	2	9	58	39	+19	32	
6	Cantonal Neuchâtel	26	10	9	7	36	29	+7	29	
7	Young Fellows Zürich	26	10	5	11	35	43	−8	25	
8	FC La Chaux-de-Fonds	26	8	7	11	42	50	−8	23	
9	Servette FC Genève	26	8	5	13	43	47	−4	21	
10	AC Bellinzona	26	5	11	10	24	32	−8	21	
11	FC Zürich	26	6	8	12	45	57	−12	20	
12	FC Biel-Bienne	26	5	10	11	39	56	−17	20	
13	FC Basel	26	6	6	14	45	59	−14	18	Relegated
14	FC St. Gallen	26	3	7	16	28	56	−28	13	Relegated

Source: rsssf.com

=== Swiss Cup ===
3 December 1944 Round 3	FC Allschwil	0–6	Basel	Sportplatz Bankverein, Allschwil
14:00		Summary	17' (0:1) Bader; 18' (0:2) Bader; 48' (0:3) Bader (0:4) Bader (0:5) Oberer (0:6) Bader	Attendance: 2,000; Referee: (Switzerland) Scherz Bern

24 December 1944 Round of 32	Basel	3–1	SC Zofingen	Landhof, Basel
14:30	Suter (1:0); Kappenberger 30' (2:0); Monigatti 40' (3:0)	Summary	(pen. 3:1) Conus	Attendance: 1,000; Referee: (Switzerland) Arn Grenchen

21 January 1945 Round of 16	St. Gallen	3–0	Basel	Espenmoos, St. Gallen
	Hager 65' (1:0); Wagner 85' (2:0); Casali 87' (3:0)	Summary		Attendance: 1,000; Referee: (Switzerland) Schmidsberger Zürich

== See also ==
- History of FC Basel
- List of FC Basel players
- List of FC Basel seasons

== Sources ==
- Rotblau: Jahrbuch Saison 2014/2015. Publisher: FC Basel Marketing AG. ISBN 978-3-7245-2027-6
- Die ersten 125 Jahre. Publisher: Josef Zindel im Friedrich Reinhardt Verlag, Basel. ISBN 978-3-7245-2305-5
- FCB team 1944–45 at fcb-archiv.ch
- Switzerland 1944–45 by Erik Garin at Rec.Sport.Soccer Statistics Foundation
