= 1945–46 FC Basel season =

FC Basel 1945–46 football season

FC Basel
1945–46 season
- Chairman: Emil Junker
- First team coach: Max Barras
- Ground: Landhof, Basel
- Nationalliga B: 1st
- Swiss Cup: Round of 16
- Top goalscorer: League: René Bader (27); All: René Bader (31)
- Highest home attendance: 7,500 on 4 November 1945 vs Nordstern Basel
- Lowest home attendance: 1,100 pn 22 June 1946 vs SC Zug
- Average home league attendance: 3,753

The FC Basel 1945–46 season was the fifty-third season since the club's foundation on 15 November 1893. FC Basel played their home games in the Landhof in the district Wettstein in Kleinbasel. Emil Junker was the club's chairman. It was his second year as president of the club.

== Overview ==
Max Barras was first team manager for the second season. Basel played a total of 42 games in their 1945–46 season. Of these 26 in the Nationalliga B, three in the Swiss Cup and 13 were test games. The test games resulted with seven victories, one draw and five defeats. In total, they won 28 games, drew six and lost eight times. In total, including the test games and the cup competition, they scored 141 goals and conceded 55.

Basel had suffered relegation the previous season and their clear aim was to obtain immediate promotion. The Nationalliga B was contested by 14 teams. The two teams that finished at the top of the division were to be promoted and the two teams that finished in last and second last position in the league table would be relegated. Basel played a good season, winning 19 league matches, drawing five, losing only two matches. Thus they ended the season with 43 points in 1st position four points ahead of Urania Genève Sport in 2nd position and these two clubs won promotion.

In the Swiss Cup Basel started in the 3rd principal round with an away tie against lower tier local side SC Schöftland this ended with a 5–1 victory. In the round of 32 Basel had an away game against Nationalliga B team Fribourg which ended with a 4–0 win. In the round of 16 Basel had a home game at the Landhof against higher tier Servette and were knocked out of the competition.

== Players ==
Note: Flags indicate national team as defined under FIFA eligibility rules; some limited exceptions apply. Players may hold more than one non-FIFA nationality.

No.	Pos.	Nation	Player
—	GK	SUI	Kurt Imhof
—	GK	SUI	Walter Müller
—	DF	SUI	Werner Bopp
—	DF	SUI	Louis Favre
—	DF	SUI	Ernst Grauer
—	DF	SUI	Ernst Hufschmid
—	MF	SUI	Paul Bader
—	MF	SUI	Alexander Ebner
—	MF	SUI	Heinz Elsässer
—	MF	SUI	Rodolfo Kappenberger
—	MF	SUI	Kurt Maurer
—	MF	SUI	Willy Monigatti
—	MF	SUI	Traugott Oberer

No.	Pos.	Nation	Player
—	MF	SUI	Guglielmo Spadini
—	MF	SUI	Tschüppeli
—	MF	SUI	Hans Vonthron
—	MF	SUI	Werner Wenk
—	MF	SUI	Rudolf Wirz
—	MF	SUI	Willy Zingg
—	FW	SUI	René Bader
—	FW	SUI	Kurt Bertsch
—	FW	SUI	Fritz Eckert (from FC Kleinhüningen)
—	FW	SUI	Werner Martin
—	FW	SUI	Alex Mathys
—	FW	SUI	Paul Stöcklin
—	FW	SUI	Hermann Suter

Players who left the squad

Note: Flags indicate national team as defined under FIFA eligibility rules; some limited exceptions apply. Players may hold more than one non-FIFA nationality.

No.	Pos.	Nation	Player
—	GK	SUI	H. Müller
—	GK	SUI	Paul Wechlin
—	MF	SUI	Alberto Losa (to Locarno)

No.	Pos.	Nation	Player
—	MF	SUI	Fritz Schmidlin
—	FW	SUI	Max Gloor
—	FW	SUI	Hans Nyffeler
—	FW	SUI	Alfred Weisshaar

== Results ==
=== Legend ===
Win Draw Loss Postponed

=== Friendly matches ===
==== Pre-season ====
August 1945 Pre-season	Basel (Switzerland)	2–4	(Belgium) RC Bruxelles	Landhof, Basel
	Goal	Summary	Goal

12 August 1945 Pre-season	Basel (Switzerland)	4–2	(Switzerland) FC Bern	Spiegelfeld, Binningen
	Stöcklin (1:1); Stöcklin (2:1); Oberer (3:2); Bader (pen. 4:2)	Summary	(0:1) Spühler (2:2) Jundt	Attendance: 2,500; Referee: (Switzerland) Hans Vogt Schweizerhalle

19 August 1945 Pre-season	FC Liestal (Switzerland)	0–8	(Switzerland) Basel	Liestal
		Summary	Goal

26 August 1945 Pre-season	SC Schöftland (Switzerland)	2–4	(Switzerland) Basel	Gemeindesportplatz, Schöftland
	Lüthy 20' (1:1); Lüthy (2:2)	Summary	10' (0:1) Oberer (1:2) Eckert; 75' (2:3) Oberer (o.g. 2;4)	Attendance: 400; Referee: (Switzerland) Huber Zürich

2 September 1945 Pre-season	Basel (Switzerland)	1–3	(Switzerland) Grenchen	Landhof, Basel
	Stöcklin	Summary	(0:1) Tschudy (0:2) Righetti (II) (0:3) Righetti (II)	Attendance: 2,500

==== Winter break to end of season ====
10 February 1946 Winter break	Bellinzona (Switzerland)	6–1	(Switzerland) Basel	Campo Granata, Bellinzona
	Frigerio 16' (1:0); Rossetti (2:0); Rossetti 57' (3:0); Rossetti (4:1); Rossetti (5:1); Rossetti (6:1)	Summary	(3:1) Maurer	Attendance: 1,200; Referee: (Switzerland) E. Guidi Bellinzona

21 April 1946 Mid-season	Basel (Switzerland)	2–3	(Austria) First Vienna	Landhof, Basel
20:00	Stöcklin 40' (1:0); Suter 66' (2:2)	Summary	42' (1:1) Fischer; 59' (1:2) Lechner; 80' (2:3) Decker	Attendance: 4,200; Referee: (Switzerland) Tschopp Delémont

16 May 1946 Mid-season	SR Colmar (France)	0–4	(Switzerland) Basel	Freiburg im Breisgau
		Summary	3' (0:1) Stöcklin; 23' (0:2) Oberer (0:3) Oberer; 63' (0:4) Bader	Attendance: 3,000

10 June 1946 Mid-season	Basel (Switzerland)	3–1	SC Wacker Wien	Landhof, Basel
17:15	Bertsch 21' (1:1); Bertsch 24' (2:1); Bader 37' (3:1)	Summary	20' (0:1) Wagner	Attendance: 3,200; Referee: (Switzerland) Schaub Basel

13 June 1946 Mid-season	Basel (Switzerland)	2–3	(England) Chelsea	Landhof, Basel
18:30	Bertsch 12' (1:0); Stöcklin 41' (2:2)	Summary	15' (1:1) Lawton; 29' (1:2) Machin; 77' (2:3) Lawton	Attendance: 7,000; Referee: (Switzerland) Scherz Bern

29 June 1946 End of season	Copenhagen XI (Norway)	1–1	(Switzerland) Basel	Copenhagen
	Präst 31' (1:1)	Summary	26' (0:1) Oberer	Attendance: 7,000

1 July 1946 End of season	Copenhagen XI (Norway)	2–4	(Switzerland) Basel	Copenhagen
	Ziegler 2' (1:0); Rasmussen (2:3)	Summary	50' (1:1) Suter; 60' (1:2) Bertsch; 75' (1:3) Suter (2:4) Oberer	Attendance: 6,000; Referee: (Norway) Pettersen Oslo

3 July 1946 End of season	Nykøbing Falster BK 1901 (Norway)	2–6	(Switzerland) Basel	Nykøbing Falster
19:30	Goal	Summary	Goal

=== Nationalliga ===
==== League matches ====
9 September 1945 Round 1	Basel	2–1	SC Derendingen	Landhof, Basel
15:00	Oberer 40' (1:1); Bader 85' (2:1)	Summary	7' (0:1) Bernhard; (red card) 44' Strähl	Attendance: 2,000; Referee: (Switzerland) Schürch Winterthur

23 September 1945 Round 2	Basel	2–0	Brühl St. Gallen	Landhof, Basel
15:00	Ebner 88' (1:0); Monigatti 89' (2:0)	Summary		Attendance: 2,700; Referee: (Switzerland) Grassi Balerna

20 September 1945 Round 3	Aarau	1–1	Basel	Stadion Brügglifeld, Aarau
	Stettler 5' (1:0)	Summary	26' (1:1) Ebner	Attendance: 2,500; Referee: (Switzerland) Tschopp Delémont

7 October 1945 Round 4	Basel	1–1	Schaffhausen	Landhof, Basel
14:30	Bader 75' (pen. 1:1)	Summary	54' (0:1) Furrer	Attendance: 3,000; Referee: (Switzerland) Iseli Biel/Bienne

14 October 1945 Round 5	Étoile-Sporting	1–2	Basel	Stade des Eplatures, La Chaux-de-Fonds
15:00	Monnier 25' (1:0)	Summary	35' (1:1) Oberer; 61' (1:2) Ebner	Attendance: 2,000; Referee: (Switzerland) Georges Craviolini Chippis

21 October 1945 Round 6	Basel	3–1	Luzern	Landhof, Basel
14:30	Bader 65' (1:0); Suter 80' (2:0); Bader 89' (3:1)	Summary	87' (2:1) Hug	Attendance: 3,500; Referee: (Switzerland) Wittwer Geneva

28 October 1945 Round 7	Fribourg	0–3	Basel	Stade Universitaire, Freiburg
	Penalty missed	Summary	23' (0:1) Bader; 60' (0:2) Oberer; 90' (pen. 0:3) Bader	Attendance: 1,500; Referee: (Switzerland) Sally Rosenbaum Zürich/St. Gallen

4 November 1945 Round 8	Basel	8–0	Nordstern Basel	Landhof, Basel
14:30	Bertsch 12' (1:0); Oberer 16' (2:0); Bader 23' (3:0); Bader 28' (4:0); Martin 35' (5:0); Bertsch 40' (6:0); Oberer 63' (7:0); Kaltenbrunner 71' (o.g. 8:0)	Summary		Attendance: 7,500; Referee: (Switzerland) Tschopp Delémont

18 November 1945 Round 9	St. Gallen	3–1	Basel	Espenmoos, St. Gallen
	Luchsinger 18' (1:0); Luchsinger 76' (pen. 2:1); W. Müller 85' (3:1)	Summary	23' (1:1) Suter	Attendance: 1,500; Referee: (Switzerland) Schmoll Zug

2 December 1945 Round 10	Basel	2–0	Urania Genève Sport	Landhof, Basel
14:30	Bader 48' (1:0); Bader 88' (2:0)	Summary		Attendance: 4,500; Referee: (Switzerland) Jaggi Bern

9 December 1945 Round 11	CS International Genève	2–1	Basel	Stade de Frontenex, Geneva
	Peyla 20' (1:0); Morier 58' (2:1)	Summary	32' (1:1) Oberer	Attendance: 1,200; Referee: (Switzerland) Tschopp Delémont

16 December 1945 Round 12	Basel	10–0	FC Helvetia Bern	Landhof, Basel
14:30	Wenk 20' (1:0); Bader 25' (2:0); Oberer 30' (3:0); Bader 35' (4:0); Oberer 40' (5:0); Bader 48' (6:0); Bader 60' (7:0); Oberer 70' (8:0); Oberer 75' (9:0); Oberer 80' (10:0)	Summary		Attendance: 3,000; Referee: (Switzerland) Schürch Winterthur

23 December 1945 Round 13	SC Zug	0–6	Basel	Herti Allmend Stadion, Zug
	Richenberger (penalty missed) 33′	Summary	35' (0:1) Bader; 58' (0:2) Wenk; 58' (0:3) Suter; 65' (0:4) Suter; 82' (0:5) Martin; 87' (0:6) Suter	Attendance: 800; Referee: (Switzerland) A. Sandoz Lausanne

February 1946 Round 14	SC Derendingen	P–P	Basel	Heidenegg, Derendingen
		[ Summary]

3 March 1946 Round 15	Brühl St. Gallen	0–0	Basel	Paul-Grüninger-Stadion, St. Gallen
14:30		Summary		Attendance: 1,000; Referee: (Switzerland) Schmoll Zug

10 March 1946 Round 16	Basel	1–1	Aarau	Landhof, Basel
15:00	Oberer 47' (1:1)	Summary	17' (0:1) Stirnemann	Attendance: 3,500; Referee: (Switzerland) Wittwer Geneva

24 March 1946 Round 17	Schaffhausen	2–7	Basel	Emmersberg, Schaffhausen
	Barchetti (1:0); Furrer (2:2)	Summary	(1:1) Grauer (1:2) Maurer (2:3) Bader (2:4) Bertsch; 47' (2:5) Bader (2:6) Bertsch (2:7) Oberer	Attendance: 2,700; Referee: (Switzerland) Schmidsberger Zürich

31 March 1946 Round 18	Basel	7–0	Étoile-Sporting	Landhof, Basel
15:00	Bader 5' (1:0); Bader 10' (2:0); Bertsch 47' (3:0); Bader 48' (4:0); Oberer 50' (5:0); Bertsch 55' (6:0); Bader 57' (7:0)	Summary		Attendance: 3,500; Referee: (Switzerland) Tschopp Delémont

7 April 1946 Round 14	SC Derendingen	0–1	Basel	Heidenegg, Derendingen
		Summary	40' (o.g.) Leist	Attendance: 1,500; Referee: (Switzerland) Merlotti Neuchâtel

14 April 1946 Round 19	Luzern	0–2	Basel	Stadion Allmend, Luzern
		Summary	48' (1:0) Stöcklin; 88' (0:2) Bertsch	Attendance: 2,600; Referee: (Switzerland) M. Tasca Geneva

28 April 1946 Round 20	Basel	6–1	Fribourg	Landhof, Basel
15:00	Stöcklin 1' (1:0); Oberer 10' (2:0); Stöcklin 65' (3:0); Stöcklin 71' (4:0); Suter 73' (5:0); Stöcklin 90' (6:1)	Summary	(5:1) Dietrich	Attendance: 4,000; Referee: (Switzerland) W. Rufli Bremgarten

5 May 1946 Round 21	Nordstern Basel	3–5	Basel	Stadion Rankhof, Basel
15:15	Hartmann 55' (pen. 1:3); Keller 72' (2:4); Scholl 75' (3:4)	Summary	21' (0:1) Oberer; 31' (0:2) Bertsch; 40' (0:3) Stöcklin; 67' (1:4) Suter; 86' (3:5) Stöcklin	Attendance: 7,000; Referee: (Switzerland) E. Ruefer Bern

19 May 1946 Round 22	Basel	2–1	St. Gallen	Landhof, Basel
15:00	Stöcklin 50' (1:1); Bader 80' (2:1)	Summary	33' (0:1) Deriaz	Attendance: 6,000; Referee: (Switzerland) Schmidsberger Zürich

26 May 1946 Round 23	Urania Genève Sport	1–1	Basel	Stade de Frontenex, Geneva
	Berloz 15' (1:0)	Summary	42' (1:1) Grauer	Attendance: 3,000; Referee: (Switzerland) Iseli Biel/Bienne

2 June 1946 Round 24	Basel	4–0	CS International Genève	Landhof, Basel
15:00	Bertsch 44' (1:0); Suter 67' (2:0); Oberer 72' (3:0); Bader 74' (4:0)	Summary		Attendance: 4,500; Referee: (Switzerland) Merlotti Neuchâtel

16 June 1946 Round 25	FC Helvetia Bern	1–6	Basel	Spitalacker, Bern
	Huck 74' (1:3)	Summary	20' (0:1) Bader; 30' (0:2) Bader; 65' (0:3) Suter; 77' (1:4) Oberer; 80' (1:5) Oberer; 83' (1:6) Oberer	Attendance: 1,300; Referee: (Switzerland) Georges Craviolini Chippis

22 June 1946 Round 26	Basel	3–1	SC Zug	Landhof, Basel
18:30	Bader 49' (1:1); Bader 73' (2:1); Bader 98' (3:1)	Summary	30' (o.g. 0:1) Wirz	Attendance: 1,100; Referee: (Switzerland) E. Ruefer Bern

==== League table ====
Pos	Team	Pld	W	D	L	GF	GA	GD	Pts	Relegation
1	Basel	26	19	5	2	87	21	+66	43	Champion Nationalliga B, promoted
2	Urania Genève Sport	26	17	5	4	53	30	+23	39	Promoted
3	St. Gallen	26	16	3	7	58	32	+26	35	
4	CS International Genève	26	12	6	8	41	37	+4	30	
5	Aarau	26	10	8	8	46	38	+8	28	
6	Nordstern Basel	26	12	4	10	54	55	−1	28	
7	Fribourg	26	11	5	10	50	53	−3	27	
8	Brühl St. Gallen	26	8	6	12	31	33	−2	22	
9	Luzern	26	8	6	12	44	48	−4	22	
10	Schaffhausen	26	8	6	12	44	50	−6	22	
11	FC Helvetia Bern	26	8	4	14	26	57	−31	20	
12	SC Zug	26	6	6	14	28	63	−35	18	Play-off winners
13	SC Derendingen	26	6	6	14	38	53	−15	18	Play-off losers, relegated
14	Étoile-Sporting	26	2	8	16	27	57	−30	12	Relegated

Source: rsssf.com

=== Swiss Cup ===
25 November 1945 3rd principal round	SC Schöftland	1–5	Basel	Gemeindesportplatz, Schöftland
	Lüthy 7' (1:0)	Summary	12' (1:1) Suter; 40' (o.g. 1:2); 44' (1:3) Bertsch (1:4) Bader (pen. 1:5) Bader	Attendance: 900; Referee: (Switzerland) Schmidsberger Zürich

13 January 1946 Round of 32	Fribourg	0–4	Basel	Stade Universitaire, Freiburg
	Thomet (penalty missed) 69′	Summary	75' (0:1) Oberer; 80' (0:2) Wenk; 84' (0:3) Wenk; 86' (0:4) Bader	Attendance: 2,500; Referee: (Switzerland) Scherz Bern

3 February 1946 Round of 16	Basel	3–4	Servette	Landhof, Basel
14:30	Bertsch 12' (1:0); Suter 27' (2:0); Bader 29' (3:0)	Summary	50' (3:1) Fatton; 62' (3:2) Tamini; 66' (3:3) Facchinetti; 90' (3:4) Tamini	Attendance: 7,000; Referee: (Switzerland) DörflingerGrenchen

== See also ==
- History of FC Basel
- List of FC Basel players
- List of FC Basel seasons

== Sources ==
- Rotblau: Jahrbuch Saison 2014/2015. Publisher: FC Basel Marketing AG. ISBN 978-3-7245-2027-6
- Die ersten 125 Jahre. Publisher: Josef Zindel im Friedrich Reinhardt Verlag, Basel. ISBN 978-3-7245-2305-5
- The FCB team 1945–46 at fcb-archiv.ch
- Switzerland 1945–46 by Erik Garin at Rec.Sport.Soccer Statistics Foundation
