= 1942–43 FC Basel season =

FC Basel
1942–43 season
- Chairman: Albert Besse
- First team coach: Eugen Rupf
- Ground: Landhof, Basel
- 1942–43 Nationalliga: 13th
- Swiss Cup: Quarter-final
- Top goalscorer: League: Hermann Suter (6); All: Hermann Suter (11)
- Highest home attendance: 8,000 on 7 May 1943 vs Nordstern Basel
- Lowest home attendance: 1,800 on 27 September 1942 vs Biel-Bienne
- Average home league attendance: 4,423

The FC Basel 1942–43 season was the fiftieth season since the club's foundation on 15 November 1893. FC Basel played their home games in the Landhof in the district Wettstein in Kleinbasel. Albert Besse was the club's chairman for the fourth consecutive season.

== Overview ==
Eugen Rupf was the team's player-coach during this season in his third season as first team manager. Basel played 33 games in the 1942–43 season, including 26 in the Nationalliga, three in the cup and four test games. They won 12, drew five and lost 16 times. They scored 59 goals and conceded 67 in the 33 competition and test games. Of the four test games, they won three and drew one. There was a fifth test match against Lausanne-Sport in Lausanne, but its date and result are unknown.

There were 14 teams contesting in the 1942–43 Nationalliga. The team that finished in the last position on the league table would be relegated. Rupf and his team had won promotion the previous season and it was clear that avoiding relegation would be a main challenge for them. Things started badly and five of their first six games ended in a defeat. Shortly before Christmas, Basel suffered their biggest defeat of the season, a 1–9 dubbing by Servette. Up until today this is still the highest score defeat that Basel have suffered in their domestic league history. They tied that unwanted record 45 years later. On 15 August 1987, in another away game, Basel were also defeated 1–9, this time by Xamax.

However, despite this defeat, with the following 3–0 away game victory against their direct opponents Luzern, who also playing at risk of relegation near the bottom of the table, and a 2–0 home game victory against their other direct opponents Nordstern, Basel ended the season with 18 points in 13th position, just two points above local rivals Nordstern, who ended the season on the relegation spot. Of their 26 league games Basel won seven, drew four and lost 15 times. They scored 29 league goals and conceded 57. Hermann Suter was the team's top league goal scorer with six goals. Erich Andres and Rodolfo Kappenberger were joint second best scorers, each with five goals.

In the Swiss Cup Basel started in the 4th principal round with a home tie at the Landhof against lower tier local side FC Pratteln. This ended with an expected easy 6–0 victory. In the round of 16 Basel were also allocated with a home match against lower tier SV Schaffhausen. Hermann Suter and Fritz Schmidlin were both able to achieve a hat-trick and Basel won 9–2. Then in the quarter-finals Basel were drawn at home against top tier Lugano. However, a 0–2 defeat ended their presence in this season's cup competition.

== Players ==
Note: Flags indicate national team as defined under FIFA eligibility rules; some limited exceptions apply. Players may hold more than one non-FIFA nationality.

No.	Pos.	Nation	Player
—	GK	SUI	Silvio Cinguetti
—	GK	SUI	Kurt Imhof
—	GK	SUI	Ernst Kipfer
—	GK	SUI	Paul Wechlin
—	DF	SUI	Louis Favre
—	DF	SUI	Ernst Grauer
—	DF	SUI	Fritz Greder (from Allschwil)
—	DF	SUI	Ernst Hufschmid
—	MF	SUI	Alexander Ebner
—	MF	SUI	Heinz Elsässer
—	MF	SUI	Rodolfo Kappenberger
—	MF	SUI	Alberto Losa

No.	Pos.	Nation	Player
—	MF	SUI	Fritz Schmidlin
—	MF	SUI	Guglielmo Spadini
—	MF	SUI	Tschüppeli
—	MF	SUI	Hans Vonthron
—	MF	SUI	Werner Wenk
—	MF	SUI	Rudolf Wirz
—	FW	SUI	Erich Andres
—	FW	SUI	Rudolf Knup
—	FW	SUI	Eugen Rupf
—	FW	SUI	Hans Spengler
—	FW	SUI	Hermann Suter
—		SUI	(?) Talone

Players who left the squad

Note: Flags indicate national team as defined under FIFA eligibility rules; some limited exceptions apply. Players may hold more than one non-FIFA nationality.

No.	Pos.	Nation	Player
—	MF	SUI	Henri Bernard
—	MF	SUI	Albert Mohler (to Nordstern Basel)
—	MF	SUI	Hans Studer

No.	Pos.	Nation	Player
—	FW	SUI	Enrico Ardizzoia
—	FW	SUI	Giuseppe Bossi
—	FW	SUI	Erhard Grieder
—	FW	SUI	Alex Mathys (to Brühl St. Gallen)

== Results ==
=== Legend ===
Win Draw Loss Postponed

=== Friendly matches ===
==== Pre-season ====
August 1942 Pre-season	Lausanne-Sport (Switzerland)	–	(Switzerland) Basel	Olympique de la Pontaise, Lausanne
		[ Summary]

16 August 1942 Pre-season	Thun (Switzerland)	2–3	(Switzerland) Basel	Grabengut, Thun
	Abbühl (1:3); Abbühl (2:3)	Summary	(0:1) Spengler (0:2) Spengler (0:3) Suter	Referee: (Switzerland) Eggenberg

23 August 1942 Pre-season	Solothurn (Switzerland)	2–3	(Switzerland) Basel	Solothurn
	Goal	Summary	Goal	Referee: (Switzerland)

30 August 1942 Pre-season	Cantonal Neuchâtel (Switzerland)	2–3	(Switzerland) Basel	Stade de Cantonal, Neuchâtel
17:00	Monnard (1:2); Sydler (2:2)	Summary	(0:1) Spengler (0:2) Spengler	Referee: (Switzerland)

==== Winter break ====
7 February 1942 Winter break	SC Schöftland (Switzerland)	1–7	(Switzerland) Basel	Schöftland
	Goal	Summary	Goal

=== Nationalliga ===
==== League matches ====
6 September 1942 Round 1	Grasshopper Club	6–0	Basel	Hardturm, Zürich
16:15	Bickel 32' (1:0); Amadò 33' (2:0); Aeby 35' (3:0); Bianchi 41' (4:0); Amadò 63' (5:0); Amadò 82' (6:0)	Summary		Referee: (Switzerland) Mario Grassi (Balerna)

13 September 1942 Round 2	Lausanne-Sport	2–1	Basel	Olympique de la Pontaise, Lausanne
15:25	Pasquini 25' (1:0); Pasquini 32' (2:0)	Summary	70' (2:1) Hufschmid	Attendance: 300; Referee: (Switzerland) Rodolphe Wittwer (Geneva)

27 September 1942 Round 3	Basel	2–1	Biel-Bienne	Landhof, Basel
15:00	Kappenberger 17' (1:0); Kappenberger 30' (2:0)	Summary	65' (2:1) Buser	Attendance: 1,800; Referee: (Switzerland) Jean Lutz (Geneva)

4 October 1942 Round 4	Young Boys	4–0	Basel	Wankdorf Stadium, Bern
15:00	Bernhard (II) 7' (1:0); Bernhard (II) 21' (2:0); Bernhard (II) 66' (3:0); Stegmeier 71' (4:0)	Summary		Attendance: 8,000; Referee: (Switzerland) } Sally Rosenbaum (Zürich/St. Gallen)

11 October 1942 Round 5	Basel	2–3	Cantonal Neuchâtel	Landhof, Basel
15:00	Schmidlin (I) (1:0); Losa 30' (2:0)	Summary	47' (2:1) Knecht; 57' (2:2) Sauvain; 85' (2:3) Knecht	Attendance: 3,500; Referee: (Switzerland) Mario Grassi (Balerna)

25 October 1942 Round 6	Lugano	5–1	Basel	Campo Marzio, Lugano
	Bossoni (1:0); Galli (2:0); Weber 64' (3:1); Frigerio (4:1); Weber 75' (5:1)	Summary	58' (2:1) Rupf	Attendance: 2,500; Referee: (Switzerland) Sally Rosenbaum (Zürich/St. Gallen)

8 November 1942 Round 7	Basel	0–0	Young Fellows Zürich	Landhof, Basel
14:30		Summary		Attendance: 2,000; Referee: (Switzerland) Lutz (Geneva)

22 November 1942 Round 8	Nordstern Basel	0–0	Basel	Stadion Rankhof, Basel
14:30		Summary		Attendance: 5,500; Referee: (Switzerland) Emil Heiniger (Bern)

29 November 1942 Round 9	Basel	1–0	Grenchen	Landhof, Basel
14:30	Kappenberger 60' (1:0)	Summary		Attendance: 4,500; Referee: (Switzerland) Paul von Wartburg (Bern)

6 December 1942 Round 10	Basel	2–1	Luzern	Landhof, Basel
14:30	Rupf 46' (1:1); Vonthron 87' (pen. 2:1)	Summary	25' (0:1) Martin	Attendance: 4,000; Referee: (Switzerland) Pusterla (Oerlikon)

13 December 1942 Round 11	Zürich	2–1	Basel	Letzigrund, Zürich
12:45	Trümpler 42' (1:0); Neumeyer 65' (2:1)	Summary	54' (1:1) Suter	Attendance: 2,500; Referee: (Switzerland) Roger Rapin (Lausanne)

20 December 1942 Round 12	Servette	9–1	Basel	Charmilles Stadium, Geneva
14:30	Walaschek (1:0); Pasteur (2:0); Perroud (3:0); Pasteur (4:0); Belli (5:1); Belli (6:1); Perroud (7:1); Perroud (8:1); Perroud (9:1)	Summary	(4:1) Suter	Attendance: 3,000; Referee: (Switzerland) Adrien Sandoz (La Chaux-de-Fonds)

27 December 1942 Round 13	Basel	2–1	St. Gallen	Landhof, Basel
14:30	Schmidlin (I) 25' (1:1); Andres 69' (2:1)	Summary	10' (0:1) Hager (II)	Attendance: 2,500; Referee: (Switzerland) Emil Heiniger (Bern)

14 February 1943 Round 14	Basel	0–2	Grasshopper Club	Landhof, Basel
15:00		Summary	40' (0:1) Amadò; 46' (0:2) Amadò	Attendance: 7,500; Referee: (Switzerland) Jean Lutz (Geneva)

21 February 1943 Round 15	Basel	0–3	Lausanne-Sport	Landhof, Basel
15:00		Summary	10' (0:1) Spagnoli; 30' (0:2) Spagnoli; 75' (0:3) Monnard	Attendance: 4,300; Referee: (Switzerland) Adien Sandoz (La Chaux-de-Fonds)

7 March 1943 Round 16	Biel-Bienne	2–1	Basel	Gurzelen Stadion, Biel/Bienne
15:00	Monbaron 16' (1:0); Buser 70' (2:1)	Summary	30' (1:1) Andres	Attendance: 2,000; Referee: (Switzerland) Josef Schürch (Winterthur)

14 March 1943 Round 17	Basel	1–1	Young Boys	Landhof, Basel
15:00	Suter 38' (1:0)	Summary	55' (1:1) Blaser	Attendance: 3,800; Referee: (Switzerland) Hans Eggmann (Zürich)

21 March 1943 Round 18	Cantonal Neuchatel	3–2	Basel	Stade de la Maladière (1924), Neuchâtel
15:00	Amey 28' (1:2); Knecht 84' (2:2); Cuany 85' (3:2)	Summary	10' (0:1) Andres; 21' (0:2) Tschüppeli	Attendance: 1,500; Referee: (Switzerland) Ernst Jaggi (Bern)

11 April 1943 Round 19	Basel	1–0	Lugano	Landhof, Basel
15:00	Andres 35' (1:0)	Summary	(red card) 53' Bottinelli	Attendance: 6,000; Referee: (Switzerland) Scherz Bern

18 April 1943 Round 20	Young Fellows Zürich	3–1	Basel	Letzigrund, Zürich
15:45	Lusenti 49' (pen. 1:1); Lusenti 64' (pen. 2:1); Kielholz 77' (3:1)	Summary	39' (pen. 0:1) Hufschmid	Attendance: 4,000; Referee: (Switzerland) Hans Wüthrich (Bern)

2 May 1943 Round 21	Basel	2–0	Nordstern Basel	Landhof, Basel
15:00	Andres 47' (1:0); Schmidlin (I) 68' (2:0)	Summary		Attendance: 8,000; Referee: (Switzerland) Paul von Wartburg (Bern)

9 May 1943 Round 22	Grenchen	2–1	Basel	Stadion Brühl, Grenchen
	Righetti (1:0); Aebi 90' (2:1)	Summary	(1:1) Spadini	Attendance: 1,000; Referee: (Switzerland) Rodolphe Wittwer (Geneva)

23 May 1943 Round 23	Luzern	0–3	Basel	Stadion Allmend, Luzern
15:00		Summary	30' (0:1) Kappenberger (0:2) Suter; 90' (0:3) Kappenberger	Attendance: 2,000; Referee: (Switzerland) Theodor Ott (Oerlikon)

30 May 1943 Round 24	Basel	2–2	Zürich	Landhof, Basel
16:00	Losa 48' (1:1); Suter 76' (2:2)	Summary	42' (0:1) Busenhardt; 68' (1:2) Schneiter	Attendance: 4,100; Referee: (Switzerland) Rodolphe Wittwer (Geneva)

6 June 1943 Round 25	Basel	0–2	Servette	Landhof, Basel
16:00		Summary	(0:1) Walaschek; 65' (0:2) Belli	Attendance: 4,500; Referee: (Switzerland) Mario Grassi (Balerna)

20 June 1943 Round 26	St. Gallen	3–2	Basel	Espenmoos, St. Gallen
14:30	Wagner 1' (1:0); Vonbüren 59' (2:1); Valentinuzzi 61' (3:1)	Summary	30' (1:1) Suter (3:2) Rupf	Attendance: 2,000; Referee: (Switzerland) Eggmann Zürich

==== League table ====
Pos	Team	Pld	W	D	L	GF	GA	GD	Pts	Qualification
1	Grasshopper Club	26	19	6	1	91	22	+69	44	Champions and Swiss Cup winners
2	Lugano	26	15	5	6	67	33	+34	35	
3	Lausanne-Sport	26	15	4	7	45	36	+9	34	
4	Young Boys	26	12	7	7	46	33	+13	31	
5	Cantonal Neuchâtel	26	13	2	11	50	45	+5	28	
6	Servette	26	12	3	11	59	44	+15	27	
7	Grenchen	26	11	5	10	47	39	+8	27	
8	St. Gallen	26	12	2	12	43	53	−10	26	
9	Biel-Bienne	26	8	4	14	33	45	−12	20	
10	Young Fellows Zürich	26	6	8	12	26	43	−17	20	
11	Zürich	26	9	2	15	38	71	−33	20	
12	Luzern	26	6	6	14	31	45	−14	18	
13	Basel	26	7	4	15	29	57	−28	18	
14	Nordstern Basel	26	5	6	15	25	64	−39	16	Relegated

Source: rsssf.com

=== Swiss Cup ===
3 January 1943 4th principal round	Basel	6–0	FC Pratteln	Landhof, Basel
14:30	Schmidlin (I) (1:0); Schmidlin (I) 56' (2:0); Andres 64' (3:0); Andres 69' (4:0); Kappenberger 76' (5:0); Suter 80' (6:0)	FCB summary		Attendance: 2,700; Referee: (Switzerland) Josef Schürch (Winterthur)

10 January 1943 Round 5	Basel	9–2	SV Schaffhausen	Landhof, Basel
14:30	Suter 12' (1:0); Schmidlin (I) 28' (2:1); Schmidlin (I) 30' (3:1); Suter 50' (4:1); Kappenberger 53' (5:1); Losa 57' (6:1); Suter 71' (7:2) own goal 74' (8:2); Schmidlin (I) 76' (9:2)	FCB summary	15' (1:1) Büche; 67' (6:2) Meier	Attendance: 3,950; Referee: (Switzerland) Paul von Wartburg (Bern)

28 February 1943 Quarter-final	Basel	0–2	Lugano	Landhof, Basel
15:00		FCB summary	16' (0:1) Frigerio; 61' (0:2) Frigerio	Attendance: 7,400; Referee: (Switzerland) Paul von Wartburg (Bern)

== See also ==
- History of FC Basel
- List of FC Basel players
- List of FC Basel seasons

== Sources ==
- Rotblau: Jahrbuch Saison 2014/2015. Publisher: FC Basel Marketing AG. ISBN 978-3-7245-2027-6
- Die ersten 125 Jahre. Publisher: Josef Zindel im Friedrich Reinhardt Verlag, Basel. ISBN 978-3-7245-2305-5
- FCB team 1942/43 at fcb-archiv.ch
- Switzerland 1942/43 by Erik Garin at Rec.Sport.Soccer Statistics Foundation
