= 1943–44 BSC Young Boys season =

BSC Young Boys
1943–44 season
- Chairman: Herrmann Wirth
- Manager: Béla Volentik
- Stadium: Stadion Wankdorf
- Nationalliga: 6th
- Swiss Cup: Quarter-finals
- Biggest win: Young Boys 11–1 La Chaux-de-Fonds
- Biggest defeat: Young Boys 1–7 Young Fellows Zürich

The 1943–44 season was the 45th season in the history of Berner Sport Club Young Boys. The team played their home games at Stadion Wankdorf in Bern.

== Overview ==
Young Boys achieved a sixth place finish in the Nationalliga and reached the quarter-finals of the Swiss Cup where they lost to runners-up FC Basel.

== Players ==
- Maurice Glur
- Hans Flühmann
- Friedrich Hurni
- Louis Gobet
- Hans Liniger
- Eugène Walaschek
- Albert Stoll
- Fritz Knecht
- Ernst Giacometti
- Hans Trachsel
- José Puigventos

== Competitions ==
=== Overall record ===
Competition	First match	Last match	Starting round	Final position	Record							
Competition	First match	Last match	Starting round	Final position	Pld	W	D	L	GF	GA	GD	Win %
Nationalliga	5 September 1943	18 June 1944	Matchday 1	6th	26	9	11	6	38	32	+6	34.62
Swiss Cup	26 December 1943	13 February 1944	Round of 32	Quarter-finals	4	2	1	1	9	7	+2	50.00
Total					30	11	12	7	47	39	+8	36.67

Source: Competitions

=== Nationalliga ===
==== League table ====
Pos	Team	Pld	W	D	L	GF	GA	GD	Pts
4	Grasshopper Club	26	13	3	10	54	32	+22	29
5	Biel-Bienne	26	12	5	9	42	30	+12	29
6	Young Boys	26	9	11	6	38	32	+6	29
7	Cantonal Neuchâtel	26	10	8	8	38	27	+11	28
8	Grenchen	26	12	4	10	45	41	+4	28

Source: rsssf.com
Rules for classification: 1) Points; 2) Goal difference within the league, however with play-off for qualifiers;

==== Matches ====
5 September 1943 Round 1	Lugano	1–2	Young Boys	Lugano
				Stadium: Campo Marzio; Attendance: 2,000; Referee: (Switzerland) Walter Häring

12 September 1943 Round 2	Young Boys	2–1	Luzern	Bern
				Stadium: Stadion Wankdorf; Attendance: 3,000; Referee: (Switzerland) Ernst Dörflinger

26 September 1943 Round 3	Grasshopper Club Zürich	3–2	Young Boys	Zürich
				Stadium: Hardturm; Attendance: 2,800; Referee: (Switzerland) Joseph Schürch

3 October 1943 Round 4	Young Boys	0–1	FC Lausanne-Sport	Bern
				Stadium: Stadion Wankdorf; Attendance: 4,500; Referee: (Switzerland) Mario Grassi

17 October 1943 Round 5	FC Biel-Bienne	1–0	Young Boys	Biel/Bienne
				Stadium: Stadion Gurzelen; Attendance: 2,800; Referee: (Switzerland) Dominé

24 October 1943 Round 6	Young Boys	0–5	Cantonal Neuchâtel	Bern
				Stadium: Stadion Wankdorf; Attendance: 4,500; Referee: (Switzerland) Jean Lutz

7 November 1943 Round 7	Basel	1–1	Young Boys	Landhof, Basel
14:30	Vonthron 85' (1:1)	Summary	20' (0:1) Bernhard	Attendance: 3,500; Referee: (Switzerland) Sandoz La Chaux-de-Fonds

14 November 1943 Round 8	Servette	0–0	Young Boys	Geneva
				Stadium: Stade des Charmilles; Attendance: 4,000; Referee: (Switzerland) A. Traub

21 November 1943 Round 9	Young Boys	1–7	Young Fellows Zürich	Bern
				Stadium: Stadion Wankdorf; Attendance: 2,500; Referee: (Switzerland) Walter Häring

28 November 1943 Round 10	Zürich	2–3	Young Boys	Zürich
				Stadium: Letzigrund; Attendance: 1,500; Referee: (Switzerland) Willy Rufli

5 December 1943 Round 11	Young Boys	1–1	Grenchen	Bern
				Stadium: Stadion Wankdorf; Attendance: 3,500; Referee: (Switzerland) Mario Grassi

12 December 1943 Round 12	La Chaux-de-Fonds	0–2	Young Boys	La Chaux-de-Fonds
				Stadium: Stade de la Charrière; Attendance: 2,500; Referee: (Switzerland) Hans Vogt

19 December 1943 Round 13	Young Boys	0–0	St. Gallen	Bern
				Stadium: Stadion Wankdorf; Attendance: 3,500; Referee: (Switzerland) A. Traub

5 March 1944 Round 16	Young Boys	0–0	Grasshopper Club Zürich	Bern
				Stadium: Stadion Wankdorf; Attendance: 3,000; Referee: (Switzerland) Hans Vogt

12 March 1944 Round 14	Young Boys	1–1	Lugano	Bern
				Stadium: Stadion Wankdorf; Attendance: 3,000; Referee: (Switzerland) A. Traub

19 March 1944 Round 17	FC Lausanne-Sport	0–0	Young Boys	Lausanne
				Stadium: Olympique de la Pontaise; Attendance: 3,500; Referee: (Switzerland) Jean Lutz

2 April 1944 Round 18	Young Boys	2–1	FC Biel-Bienne	Bern
				Stadium: Stadion Wankdorf; Attendance: 6,000; Referee: (Switzerland) Rosenbaum

16 April 1944 Round 15	Luzern	0–1	Young Boys	Lucerne
				Stadium: Stadion Allmend; Attendance: 2,600; Referee: (Switzerland) Hans Vogt

23 April 1944 Round 19	Cantonal Neuchâtel	0–0	Young Boys	Neuchâtel
				Stadium: Stade de la Maladière; Attendance: 3,800; Referee: (Switzerland) Rodolphe Wittwer

30 April 1944 Round 20	Young Boys	0–3	Basel	Wankdorf Stadium, Bern
		Summary	12' (0:1) Hufschmid; 74' (0:2) Kappenberger; 77' (0:3) Weisshaar	Attendance: 3,500; Referee: (Switzerland) Lutz Geneva

7 May 1944 Round 21	Young Boys	2–2	Servette	Bern
				Stadium: Stadion Wankdorf; Attendance: 3,500; Referee: (Switzerland) Mario Grassi

14 May 1944 Round 22	Young Fellows Zürich	0–4	Young Boys	Zürich
				Stadium: Letzigrund; Attendance: 4,500; Referee: (Switzerland) Adrien Sandoz

21 May 1944 Round 23	Young Boys	1–1	Zürich	Bern
				Stadium: Stadion Wankdorf; Attendance: 3,000; Referee: (Switzerland) Hans Vogt

4 June 1944 Round 24	Grenchen	0–0	Young Boys	Grenchen
				Stadium: Stadion Brühl; Attendance: 1,000; Referee: (Switzerland) Jean Lutz

11 June 1944 Round 25	Young Boys	11–1	La Chaux-de-Fonds	Bern
	Ernst Giacometti 9', 40', 75'; Fritz Knecht 20'; José Puigventos 30', 50', 86'; Eugène Walaschek 55', 63'; Albert Stoll 80'; Hans Trachsel 87'		André Neury 83'	Stadium: Stadion Wankdorf; Attendance: 3,000; Referee: (Switzerland) Alfred Schmoll

18 June 1944 Round 26	St. Gallen	0–2	Young Boys	St. Gallen
			Fritz Knecht 20', 80'	Stadium: Espenmoos; Attendance: 1,000; Referee: (Switzerland) Franz Beck

=== Swiss Cup ===
26 December 1943 Round of 32	FC Bern	1–4	Young Boys	Bern
				Stadium: Stadion Neufeld

9 January 1944 Round of 16	Luzern	1–1 (a.e.t.)	Young Boys	Lucerne
				Stadium: Stadion Allmend

23 January 1944 Round of 16 replay	Young Boys	3–0	Luzern	Bern
				Stadium: Stadion Wankdorf

13 February 1944 Quarter-finals	Basel	5–1	Young Boys	Basel
14:30	Weisshaar 26'; Vonthron 32'; Weisshaar; Weisshaar 79'; Kappenberger 81'		Bernhard 17'	Stadium: Landhof; Attendance: 3,500; Referee: Widmer
