= 1943–44 Swiss Cup =

Tournament details
- Country: Switzerland

Final positions
- Champions: Lausanne-Sport
- Runners-up: Basel

The 1943–44 Swiss Cup was the 19th season of Switzerland's football cup competition, organised annually since the 1925–26 season by the Swiss Football Association.

== Overview ==
=== Preamble ===
In Switzerland during the second world war, sport became an integral part of the "spiritual national defense". This was a political and cultural movement that had already become increasingly important during the late 1930s. Politicians, intellectuals and media professionals had increasingly called for measures to strengthen Switzerland's basic cultural values. As football games were also considered to be one of the activities that seemed important for maintaining the morale of the population, the military authorities put considerably fewer obstacles in the way of the top players and the clubs as they had during the previous World War.

=== ASF/SFV ===
Therefore, it came about that the Swiss Football Association (ASF/SFV) expanded themselves. To this date, the Association had 14 members in the top-tier and 25 members in the second-tier, calles 1. Liga. The decision of the extraordinary assembly, held on 9 October 1943 in Lugano, was to double the number of top-tier members to 28 clubs for the following season. The Nationalliga would then be divided into two strength classes each with 14 teams. The Nationalliga would become the new Nationalliga A (NLA), while the Nationalliga B (NLB) would be completely newly formed. From this moment, the 1. Liga would become the third-tier of the Swiss football league system and would also be increased in size, from 25 clubs in two groups, to 30 clubs in three groups with 10 teams each.

=== Format ===
This season's cup competition began on 22 August 1943 with the first two games of the preliminary round, the rest were played one week later on the week-end of 29 August. The competition was to be completed on Easter Monday, 10 April 1944, with the final, which, since 1937, was traditionally held in the country's capital, at the former Wankdorf Stadium in Bern. The preliminary round was held for the lower league teams that had not qualified themselves for the competition. The lower league teams that had qualified joined the competition in the first round. The clubs from this season's 1. Liga were given a bye for the first round and joined the competition in the second round. The clubs from the 1943–44 Nationalliga were given byes for the first three rounds. These teams joined the competition in the fourth round, which was played on the third day of Christmas, 26 December. In total 222 clubs played in this season's Cup competition, 14 from the Nationalliga, 25 from the 1. Liga, 68 from the 2. Liga and 115 from fourth tier 3. Liga.

The matches were played in a knockout format. In the event of a draw after 90 minutes, the match went into extra time. In the event of a draw at the end of extra time, if agreed between the clubs, a replay was foreseen and this was played on the visiting team's pitch. Rules and regulations to this situation were altered and amended continuously by each regional football association, due to the current situation (second world war). If the replay ended in a draw after extra time, or if a replay had not been agreed, a toss of a coin would establish the team that qualified for the next round.

== Preliminary round ==
The lower league teams that had not qualified themselves for the competition via their regional football association's own regional cup competitions or had not achieved their association's requirements, competed here in a kind of second chance round. Reserve teams were not admitted to the competition. The draw respected local regionalities. The preliminary round was played, with three exceptions, on Saturday 29 August 1943 and it consisted of 31 matches.

=== Summary ===
Team 1	Score	Team 2
22 August 1943
Bex	4–6	FC Saint-Maurice
Sion	2–0	Martigny-Sports
29 August 1943
Carouge Stade	2–3	FC Gardy-Jonction (GE)
Regina FC (GE)	4–0	Estella FC (GE)
Amical-Abattoirs (GE)	3–1	FC Saint-Jean (GE)
Stade Nyonnais	11–0	Saint-Prex FC
Chênois	5–0; Awd 0–3	Compesières FC
Pully FC	2–1	Vignoble Cully
Echallens	0–3	FC Ambrosiana Lausanne
FC Le Sentier	3–0	FC Cossonay
FC Forward Morges	2–3	Racing Club Lausanne
Stade Lausanne	1–6	ES Malley
FC Tramelan	2–3	Moutier
FC Yverdon	4–1	FC Stade Payerne
Couvet-Sports	0–3	FC Fleurier
Saint-Imier-Sports	1–0	FC Tavannes
FC Salgesch/Salquenen	3–8	FC Sierre
CS La Tour-de-Peilz	2–7	Monthey
FC Orbe	1–6	Concordia Yverdon
FC Floria Olympic	1–3	Le Locle-Sports
FC Fontainemelon	0–3	Hauterive
FC Le Neuveville	2–3	FC Madretsch (Biel)
FC Bévillard	2–6	FC Reconvilier
FC Mett	6–2	US Bienne-Boujean
FC Langenthal	11–0	FC Herzogenbuchsee
Köniz	1–2	Minerva Bern
FC Langnau im Emmental	5–1	FC Längasse (Bern)
FC Viktoria Bern	1–2	Zähringia Bern
FC Weinfelden	0–1	FC Amriswil
Frauenfeld	3–1	Kreuzlingen
5 September 1943
FC Richemond (FR)	1–8	Central Fribourg

== Round 1 ==
In the first round, the lower league teams that had already qualified themselves for the competition through their regional football association's own regional requirements competed here, together with the winners of the preliminary round. Whenever possible, the draw respected local regionalities. Most of the games of the first round were played on Saturday 26 September, however, some games were played a few weeks later.

=== Summary ===
Team 1	Score	Team 2
26 September 1943
FC Sargans	4–5	Red Star
FC Neuhausen	1–4	Frauenfeld
Winterthur	5–2	FC Tössfeld (Winterthur)
FC Rorschach	3–1	Arbon
FC Fortuna (SG)	4–5	FC Wil
FC Horgen	4–2	Emmenbrücke
FC Rüti (ZH)	3–1	FC Glarus
FC Adliswil	3–1	FC Wetzikon
FC Altstetten (Zürich)	12–0	Ass. Ticinese
Black Boys (ZH)	2–3	Polizei Zürich
FC Wiedikon	3–2	Blue Stars
Baden	1–0	SV Seebach
FC Turgi	2–1	Wettingen
Sporting Aarau	0–4	FC Gränichen
FC Trimbach	3–6	Zofingen
Schöftland	4–1	Wohlen
Old Boys	2–0 annulled	FC Riehen
FC Pratteln	4–2	SV Sissach
FC Liestal	1–6	Binningen
Zähringia Bern	2–3 (a.e.t.)	FC Langnau im Emmental
FC Lerchenfeld (Thun)	2–1	Minerva Bern
FC Aegerten-Brügg	1–2	FC Langenthal
Mendrisio	4–2	US Giubiasco
FC Saint-Maurice	1–3	Monthey
FC Sierre	2–1	Sion
FC Porrentruy	3–1	FC Reconvilier
FC Colombier	2–3	FC Hauterive
Moutier	0–1	FC Fleurier
Le Locle-Sports	2–1	Saint-Imier-Sports
FC Yverdon	0–4	Concordia Yverdon
FC Le Sentier	3–6	FC Ambrosiana Lausanne
Amical-Abattoirs (GE)	2–1	FC Compesières
FC Gardy-Jonction (GE)	2–3	Regina Genève
Bulle	2–1	Central Fribourg
FC Wädenswil	2–1	Gossau
Laufen	9–0	FC Breitenbach
FC Ems	FF awd 0–3	GC Biasca
Pully FC	FF awd 0–3	Stade Nyonnais
Wacker Grenchen	FF awd 3–0	Burgdorf
3 October 1943
FC Mett	0–1	FC Madretsch (Biel)
FC Gerlafingen	3–2 (a.e.t.)	Lengnau
SV Lyss	2–3 (a.e.t.)	FC Grünstern (Ipsach)
Ballspielclub Zürich	0–6	FC Allschwil
FC Schaffhausen	4–0	Spvg Schaffhausen
10 October 1943
FC Amriswil	2–1	FC Töss (Winterthur)
Racing Club Lausanne	3–0	ES Malley

Replay

Team 1	Score	Team 2
3 October 1943
Old Boys	4–1	FC Riehen

=== Matches ===
26 September 1943

Sporting Aarau	0–4	FC Gränichen
	FCA summary	Goal

Stadion Brügglifeld, Aarau

== Round 2 ==
The teams from this years 1. Liga joined the competition in this round, together with the winners of the first round.

=== Summary ===
Team 1	Score	Team 2
10 October 1943
Bern	1–0	FC Pratteln
Black Stars	1–2	FC Helvetia Bern
Binningen	2–3	FC Birsfelden
Zofingen	5–2	US Bienne-Boujean
FC Porrentruy	0–1	SC Kleinhüningen
Moutier	3–0	Étoile-Sporting
FC Concordia Yverdon	5–3	FC Renens
Monthey	2–4	Montreux-Sports
Vevey Sports	1–0 abd awd 3–0	FC Sierre
Kickers Luzern	1–0	FC Horgen
CS International Genève	3–1	Regina FC (GE)
Fribourg	2–1	FC Langnau im Emmental
Gossau	1–2	Brühl
CA Genève	1–2 (a.e.t.)	Stade Nyonnais
FC Rorschach	0–4	Aarau
Solothurn	3–1	GC Biasca
Schaffhausen	2–4	SC Zug
FC Rüti (ZH)	3–0	Concordia
FC Allschwil	1–3 * annulled	Nordstern
FC Madretsch (Biel)	0–2	Urania Genève Sport
Lengnau	1–4	FC Gränichen
FC Lerchenfeld (Thun)	2–1	FC Grünstern (Ipsach)
Le Locle-Sports	2–1	FC Hauterive
Amical-Abattoirs (GE)	2–1	FC Ambrosiana Lausanne
FC Adliswil	5–4 (a.e.t.)	FC Turgi
Frauenfeld	2–1	FC Wil
FC Wiedikon	2–4	FC Altstetten (Zürich)
Old Boys	2–3	Laufen
17 October 1943
US Pro Daro	5–2	Polizei Zurich
Locarno	3–0	Red Star
Mendrisio	1–3	Chiasso
Baden	0–7	Bellinzona
Bulle	1–2 (a.e.t.)	Racing Club Lausanne
SC Derendingen	3–3 (a.e.t.)	Schöftland
24 October 1943
Wacker Grenchen	1–1 (a.e.t.)	FC Langenthal
FC Amriswil	0–6	Winterthur

- Note: the match Vevey-Sports–Sierre was abandoned at 63' and awarded 3–0.
- Note: the match Allschwil–Nordstern was annuked and replayed after a protest from Allschwil.

Replays

Team 1	Score	Team 2
31 October 1943
FC Langenthal	4–0	Wacker Grenchen
7 November 1943
FC Allschwil	3–4	Nordstern
Schöftland	2–0	SC Derendingen

=== Matches ===
10 October 1943

FC Rorschach	0–4	Aarau
	FCA summary	Goal

Sportplatz Pestalozzi, Rorschach
- FC Rorschach played the 1943/44 season in the 2. Liga (third tier). Aarau played the 1943/44 season in the 1. Liga (second tier).

== Round 3 ==
=== Summary ===
Team 1	Score	Team 2
7 November 1943
FC Altstetten (Zürich)	0–1	SC Zug
Bellinzona	4–0	Locarno
Concordia Yverdon	1–2	CS International Genève
Le Locle-Sports	0–3	Urania Genève Sport
FC Helvetia Bern	0–2	FC Lerchenfeld (Thun)
Zofingen	4–7 (a.e.t.)	FC Gränichen
FC Langenthal	0–1	Bern
FC Rüti (ZH)	2–4 (a.e.t.)	Brühl
Stade Nyonnais	2–3	Vevey Sports
Montreux-Sports	3–2	Racing-Club Lausanne
Laufen	1–3	FC Birsfelden
Amical-Abattoirs (GE)	0–5	Fribourg
Solothurn	0–3	Aarau
Kickers Luzern	3–1	FC Adliswil
Chiasso	3–0	US Pro Daro
Winterthur	3–2	Frauenfeld
12 November 1943
Schöftland	0–2	Moutier
14 December 1943
Nordstern	1–0	SC Kleinhüningen

=== Matches ===
7 November 1943

Solothurn	0–3	Aarau
	FCA summary	Goal

Stadion FC Solothurn
- Solothurn and Aarau both played the 1943/44 season in the 1. Liga (second tier).

== Round 4 ==
The teams from this season's Nationalliga, who had received a bye for the first three rounds, entered the cup competition in this round. However, the teams from the Nationalliga were seeded and could not be drawn against each other. Whenever possible, the draw respected local regionalities. The fourth round was played on the third day of Christmas, Boxing Day.

=== Summary ===
Team 1	Score	Team 2
26 December 1943
Zürich	2–0	SC Zug
Bellinzona	1–0	Lugano
CS International Genève	0–2 *	Lausanne-Sport
Servette	1–1 (a.e.t.)	Urania Genève Sport
FC Lerchenfeld (Thun)	0–2	Biel-Bienne
Grenchen	6–1	FC Gränichen
Basel	4–1	Nordstern
Bern	1–4	Young Boys
Brühl	0–2	St. Gallen
Cantonal Neuchâtel	1–1 (a.e.t.)	Vevey Sports
Montreux-Sports	1–5	La Chaux-de-Fonds
Grasshopper Club	7–0	FC Birsfelden
Fribourg	2–0	Aarau
Kickers Luzern	1–4	Chiasso
Luzern	1–0	Winterthur
Moutier	1–3 (a.e.t.)	Young Fellows

- Note: the match CS International–Lausanne-Sport was played in Lausanne.

Replays

Team 1	Score	Team 2
2 January 1944
Urania Genève Sport	0–3	Servette
Vevey Sports	2–0	Cantonal Neuchâtel

=== Matches ===
26 December 1943

Zürich	2–0	SC Zug
Bosshard 50' (1:0); Fader 85' (2:0)	FCZ summary

Hardturm, Zürich
Attendance: 1,500
Referee: (Switzerland) Marco Grassi (Bellinzona)
- SC Zug played the 1943/44 season in the 1. Liga (second tier)

26 December 1943

Servette	1–1 (a.e.t.)	Urania Genève Sport
Belli	summary	Goal

Stade des Charmilles, Geneva
- Urania played the 1943/44 season in the 1. Liga (second tier).

2 January 1944
Replay

Urania Genève Sport	0–3	Servette
	summary	(0:1) Pasteur (0:2) Belli (0:3) Tamini

Stade de Frontenex, Genève

26 December 1943
14:00

Basel	4–1	Nordstern Basel
Suter 21' (1:0); Bertsch 32' (2:0); Suter 77' (pen. 3:1); Hufschmid (4:1)	FCB summary	56' (2:1) Wiesner

Landhof, Basel
Attendance: 4,000
Referee: (Switzerland) Josef Schürch (Winterthur)
- Nordstern played the 1943/44 season in the 1. Liga (second tier).

26 December 1943

Fribourg	2–0	Aarau
Goal	FCA summary

Stade Universitaire Saint-Léonard, Fribourg

== Round 5 ==
=== Summary ===
Team 1	Score	Team 2
6 January 1944
Bellinzona	3–1	Chiasso
9 January 1944
Grasshopper Club	1–1 (a.e.t.)	Zürich
Vevey Sports	0–2	Lausanne-Sport
Servette	8–1	Fribourg
Young Fellows	1–2	Biel-Bienne
Grenchen	1–0	La Chaux-de-Fonds
Basel	6–2	St. Gallen
Luzern	1–1 (a.e.t.)	Young Boys

Replays

Team 1	Score	Team 2
23 January 1944
Zürich	1–0	Grasshopper Club
Young Boys	3–0	Luzern

=== Matches ===
9 January 1944

Grasshopper Club	1–1 (a.e.t.)	Zürich
Amadò 72' (pen.) (1:1))	FCZ summary	36' (pen.) (0:1)) Walter

Hardturm, Zürich
Attendance: 3,500
Referee: (Switzerland) Josef Schürch (Winterthur)

23 January 1944
Replay

Zürich	1–0	Grasshopper Club
Bosshard 15' (1:0)	FCZ summary

Letzigrund, Zürich
Attendance: 5,000
Referee: (Switzerland) Paul von Wartburg (Bern)

9 January 1944

Servette	8–1	Fribourg
3x Belli; 1x Bacher; 2x Tamini; 1x Bachasse; 1x Pasteur	Servette summary	Goal

Stade des Charmilles, Geneva

9 January 1944
14:00

Basel	6–2	St. Gallen
Ebner 10' (1:0); Bertsch 22' (2:0); Ebner 44' (3:0); Ebner 56' (4:1); Suter 66' (pen. 5:1); Ebner 75' (6:1)	FCB summary	52' (o.g. 3:1); (red card) 66' Schenker; 52' (6:2) Wagner

Landhof, Basel
Attendance: 3,000
Referee: (Switzerland) Jean Lutz (Geneva)

== Quarter-finals ==
=== Summary ===
Team 1	Score	Team 2
13 February 1944
Zürich	1–0	Bellinzona
Lausanne-Sport	3–2	Servette
Biel-Bienne	1–1 (a.e.t.)	Grenchen
Basel	5–1	Young Boys

Replay

Team 1	Score	Team 2
27 February 1944
Grenchen	0–1	Biel-Bienne

=== Matches ===
13 February 1944

Zürich	1–0	Bellinzona
Bosshard 30' (1:0)	FCZ summary

Letzigrund, Zürich
Attendance: 5,000
Referee: (Switzerland) Anton Traub (Basel)

13 February 1944

Lausanne-Sport	3–2	Servette
Goal	Servette summary	Pasteur; Belli

Pontaise, Lausanne

13 February 1944
14:30

Basel	5–1	Young Boys
Weisshaar 26' (1:1); Vonthron 32' (2:1); Weisshaar (3:1); Weisshaar 79' (4:1); Kappenberger 81' (5:1)	FCB summary	17' (0:1) Bernhard

Landhof, Basel
Attendance: 3,500
Referee: (Switzerland) Widmer (Geneva)

== Semi-finals ==
=== Summary ===
Team 1	Score	Team 2
12 March 1944
Lausanne-Sport	1–0	Zürich
Biel-Bienne	0–1	Basel

=== Matches ===
12 March 1944

Lausanne-Sport	1–0	Zürich
Monnard 75' (1:0)	FCZ summary

Pontaise, Lausanne
Attendance: 8,000
Referee: (Switzerland) Hans Vogt (Basel)

12 March 1944
15:00

Biel-Bienne	0–1	Basel
	FCB summary	67' (0:1) Vonthron

Hardturm, Zürich
Attendance: 4,000
Referee: (Switzerland) Marco Grassi (Bellinzona)

== Final ==
The final was traditionally held in the capital Bern, at the former Wankdorf Stadium. This took place on Easter Monday 1944.

=== Summary ===
Team 1	Score	Team 2
10 April 1944
Lausanne-Sport	3–0	Basel

=== Telegram ===
10 April 1944
15:00

Lausanne-Sport	3–0	Basel
Monnard 85' (1:0); Courtois 88' (2:0); Monnard 90' (3:0)	Fussball-Schweiz summary FCB summary

Wankdorf Stadium, Bern
Attendance: 15,000
Referee: (Switzerland) Hans Wüthrich (Bern)

Lausanne-Sport won the cup and this was the club's third cup title to this date. Six weeks later the team also won the domestic league therefore they secured themselves the double and this was the second time that they won the double.

== Further in Swiss football ==
- 1943–44 Nationalliga
- 1943–44 Swiss 1. Liga

== Sources ==
- Fussball-Schweiz
- FCB Cup games 1943–44 at fcb-achiv.ch
- Switzerland 1943–44 at RSSSF

Preceded by 1942–43	Swiss Cup seasons	Succeeded by 1944–45
