= Knup =

Knup may refer to:

- A traditional bamboo rain shields worn by the Khasi Tribe of Meghalaya, India.
- Khmer National United Party, a political party in Cambodia
- Adrian Knup (born 1968), Swiss footballer and manager, played for Switzerland and various clubs in the 1980s–1990s
- Rudolf Knup, Swiss footballer, played for Swiss clubs in the 1940s
