= Greder =

Greder is a surname. Notable people with this surname include:

- Claude Greder (1934–2005), French water polo player
- Fritz Greder (fl. 1940s), Swiss footballer
