= Werner Martin =

Swiss footballer (born 1928)

Personal information
- Full name: Werner Martin
- Date of birth: 16 September 1928 (age 98)
- Position: Forward

Senior career*
Years	Team	Apps	(Gls)
1945–1946	FC Basel	12	(2)
- * Club domestic league appearances and goals

Werner Martin (born 16 September 1928) was a Swiss footballer who played for FC Basel. He played as a forward.

Martin joined Basel's first team for their 1945–46 season under team manager Max Barras. After playing two test matches, he made his domestic league debut for the club in the home game at the Landhof on 9 September 1945 as Basel won 2–1 against SC Derendingen. He scored his first goal for his club on 4 November as Basel won 8–0 at home to Nordstern Basel.

In his one season at the club Martin played 15 games and scored twice; 12 of the games were in the Nationalliga B, 1 in the Swiss Cup and 2 were friendly games. Both of his goals were scored in the domestic league.

== Sources ==
- Rotblau: Jahrbuch Saison 2017/2018. Publisher: FC Basel Marketing AG. ISBN 978-3-7245-2189-1
- Die ersten 125 Jahre. Publisher: Josef Zindel im Friedrich Reinhardt Verlag, Basel. ISBN 978-3-7245-2305-5
- Verein "Basler Fussballarchiv" Homepage

(NB: Despite all efforts, the editors of these books and the authors in "Basler Fussballarchiv" have failed to be able to identify all the players, their date and place of birth or date and place of death, who played in the games during the early years of FC Basel)
