= Willy Monigatti =

Swiss footballer

Personal information
- Full name: Willy Monigatti
- Date of birth: unknown
- Place of birth: Switzerland
- Position: Midfielder

Senior career*
Years	Team	Apps	(Gls)
1944–1949	FC Basel	32	(11)
- * Club domestic league appearances and goals

Willy Monigatti was a Swiss footballer who played for FC Basel. He played as midfielder.

Monigatti joined Basel's first team during their 1944–45 season under team manager Max Barras. After appearing in two test games, Monigatti played his domestic league debut for the club in the away game on 29 October 1944, as Basel were defeated 0–2 by Servette. He scored his first goal for the club on 25 March 1945, in a home game at the Landhof as Basel played to a 4–4 draw with Lugano. Basel suffered relegation that season. Monigatti played in 18 domestic league games and scored nine goals.

In Basel's 1945–46 season, Monigatti played only six league games, but helped Basel win the Nationalliga B group and gain promotion. He stayed with the club another three seasons, but played only occasionally during this time. Between the years 1944 and 1949, Monigatti played a total of 51 games for Basel scoring a total of 19 goals. 32 of these games were in the Nationalliga, four in the Swiss Cup and 15 were friendly games. He scored 11 goals in the domestic league, one in the cup and the other seven were scored during the test games.

== Sources ==
- Rotblau: Jahrbuch Saison 2017/2018. Publisher: FC Basel Marketing AG. ISBN 978-3-7245-2189-1
- Die ersten 125 Jahre. Publisher: Josef Zindel im Friedrich Reinhardt Verlag, Basel. ISBN 978-3-7245-2305-5
- Verein "Basler Fussballarchiv" Homepage

(NB: Despite all efforts, the editors of these books and the authors in "Basler Fussballarchiv" have failed to be able to identify all the players, their date and place of birth or date and place of death, who played in the games during the early years of FC Basel)
