= 1943–44 Nationalliga =

Swiss football season

Nationalliga
- Season: 1943–44
- Dates: 6 September 1943 – 18 June 1944
- Champions: Lausanne-Sport (5th title)
- Relegated: Luzern
- Matches: 182
- Goals: 555 (3.05 per match)
- Top goalscorer: Erich Andres (Young Fellows); 23 goals

The following is the summary of the Swiss National League in the 1943–44 football season. This was the 47th season of top-tier Swiss football.

== Overview ==
=== Preamble ===
In Switzerland during the second world war, sport became an integral part of the "spiritual national defense". This was a political and cultural movement that had already become increasingly important during the late 1930s. Politicians, intellectuals and media professionals had increasingly called for measures to strengthen Switzerland's basic cultural values. Since the Nationalliga games were also considered to be one of the activities that seemed important for maintaining the morale of the population, the military authorities put considerably fewer obstacles in the way of the top players as they had during the previous World War.

=== ASF/SFV ===
Therefore, it came about that the Swiss Football Association (ASF/SFV) expanded themselves. To this date, the Association had 14 members in the top-tier and 25 members in the second-tier, calles 1. Liga. The decision of the extraordinary assembly, held on 9 October 1943 in Lugano, was to double the number of top-tier members to 28 clubs for the following season. The Nationalliga would then be divided into two strength classes each with 14 teams. The Nationalliga would become the new Nationalliga A (NLA), while the Nationalliga B (NLB) would be completely newly formed. The second-tier would be contested by the one relegated team from the NLA and the 13 best teams of the 1943–44 1. Liga season. From this moment, the 1. Liga would become the third-tier of the Swiss football league system and would also be increased in size, from 25 clubs in two groups, to 30 clubs in three groups with 10 teams each.

=== Format ===
The 14 teams, in this final Nationalliga season, played a double round-robin to decide their table positions. Two points were awarded for a win and one point was awarded for a draw. It was contested by the top 13 teams from the 1942–43 Nationalliga and the newly promoted, 1. Liga champion, La Chaux-de-Fonds.

== Nationalliga ==
=== Teams, locations ===
Team	Based in	Canton	Stadium	Capacity
FC Basel	Basel	Basel-Stadt	Landhof	4,000
FC Biel-Bienne	Biel/Bienne	Bern	Stadion Gurzelen	5,500
FC Cantonal Neuchâtel	Neuchâtel	Neuchâtel	Stade de la Maladière	25,500
Grasshopper Club Zürich	Zürich	Zürich	Hardturm	20,000
FC Grenchen	Grenchen	Solothurn	Stadium Brühl	15,100
FC La Chaux-de-Fonds	La Chaux-de-Fonds	Neuchâtel	Centre Sportif de la Charrière	10,000
FC Lausanne-Sport	Lausanne	Vaud	Pontaise	30,000
FC Lugano	Lugano	Ticino	Cornaredo Stadium	6,330
FC Luzern	Lucerne	Lucerne	Stadion Allmend	25,000
Servette FC	Geneva	Geneva	Stade des Charmilles	27,000
FC St. Gallen	St. Gallen	St. Gallen	Espenmoos	11,000
BSC Young Boys	Bern	Bern	Wankdorf Stadium	56,000
FC Young Fellows	Zürich	Zürich	Utogrund	2,850
FC Zürich	Zürich	Zürich	Letzigrund	25,000

=== Final league table ===
Pos	Team	Pld	W	D	L	GF	GA	GD	Pts	Qualification or relegation
1	Lausanne-Sport	26	17	4	5	48	25	+23	38	Swiss Champions and Swiss Cup winners
2	Servette	26	12	8	6	39	25	+14	32	
3	Lugano	26	12	6	8	47	32	+15	30	
4	Grasshopper Club	26	13	3	10	54	32	+22	29	
5	Biel-Bienne	26	12	5	9	42	30	+12	29	
6	Young Boys	26	9	11	6	38	32	+6	29	
7	Cantonal Neuchâtel	26	10	8	8	38	27	+11	28	
8	Grenchen	26	12	4	10	45	41	+4	28	
9	Basel	26	9	8	9	42	38	+4	26	
10	La Chaux-de-Fonds	26	10	6	10	34	45	−11	26	
11	Young Fellows Zürich	26	9	3	14	46	51	−5	21	
12	St. Gallen	26	8	3	15	26	60	−34	19	
13	Zürich	26	6	5	15	37	54	−17	17	
14	Luzern	26	4	4	18	19	63	−44	12	Relegated to 1944–45 Nationalliga B

Source: rsssf.com
Rules for classification: 1) Points; 2) Goal difference within the league, however with play-off for qualifiers;

=== Results ===
Home \ Away	BAS	BB	CAN	CDF	GCZ	GRE	LS	LUG	LUZ	SER	STG	YB	YFZ	ZÜR
Basel		2–0	1–1	1–1	2–1	2–3	2–1	0–0	1–1	1–1	6–1	1–1	2–0	3–0
Biel-Bienne	2–0		0–1	3–0	0–2	2–0	5–1	1–1	4–1	0–1	2–1	1–0	1–0	1–1
Cantonal Neuchâtel	2–0	1–1		0–0	0–2	4–1	2–0	5–0	0–1	1–1	1–1	0–0	2–1	1–1
La Chaux-de-Fonds	3–1	1–1	1–1		1–0	2–0	2–3	0–5	3–0	2–1	2–0	0–2	1–1	3–2
Grasshopper Club	1–2	5–1	2–1	1–3		0–2	0–2	0–0	5–2	0–1	1–1	3–2	1–0	4–1
Grenchen	4–1	2–1	1–0	3–1	1–4		1–1	0–0	2–0	2–0	7–1	0–0	4–1	2–1
Lausanne-Sports	4–1	2–1	4–1	2–1	3–2	3–1		2–0	2–0	0–0	7–0	0–0	1–1	1–0
Lugano	2–1	1–2	1–0	1–3	1–2	3–1	0–1		6–0	0–1	3–1	1–2	3–2	5–1
Luzern	1–1	3–0	2–1	0–0	0–8	1–2	1–2	0–1		2–1	1–3	0–1	2–1	1–4
Servette	1–1	1–1	2–1	2–0	1–3	4–1	2–1	2–2	2–1		0–1	0–0	4–1	1–0
St. Gallen	2–1	0–5	1–2	1–0	2–5	2–1	0–1	2–4	2–0	1–4		0–2	2–0	0–3
Young Boys	0–3	2–1	0–5	11–1	0–0	1–1	0–1	1–1	2–1	2–2	0–0		1–7	1–1
Young Fellows	1–3	4–2	3–1	2–1	2–1	2–1	2–1	1–3	5–1	0–3	2–0	0–4		5–2
Zürich	4–3	0–1	1–3	2–1	0–2	4–2	0–2	1–3	1–1	2–1	0–1	2–3	3–3	

Source: rsssf.com
Legend: Blue = home team win; Yellow = draw; Red = away team win.

=== Topscorers ===
Rank	Player	Nat.	Goals	Club
1.	Erich Andres	(Switzerland)	23	Young Fellows Zürich
2.	Alfred Bickel	(Switzerland)	15	Grasshopper Club
2.	Alfred Weisshaar	(Switzerland)	15	Basel
4.	Numa Monnard	(Switzerland)	14	Lausanne-Sport
5.	André Facchinetti	(Switzerland)	13	Cantonal Neuchâtel
5.	Marc Perroud	(Switzerland)	13	La Chaux-de-Fonds
5.	Josef Righetti	(Switzerland)	13	Grenchen
8.	Domenico Gallo	(Switzerland)	12	Lugano
9.	Hans-Peter Friedländer	(Switzerland)	11	Grasshopper Club
10.	Walter Bosshard	(Switzerland)	10	Zürich
10.	Robert Hasler	(Switzerland)	10	Biel-Bienne

== Attendances ==
#	Club	Average
1	Lausanne	5,346
2	Young Fellows	4,962
3	Servette	4,615
4	Zürich	4,423
5	Basel	4,369
6	GCZ	3,769
7	Young Boys	3,577
8	Cantonal	3,477
9	La Chaux-de-Fonds	2,792
10	Biel-Bienne	2,554
11	Lugano	2,231
12	Luzern	2,215
13	St. Gallen	2,123
14	Grenchen	1,923

== Further in Swiss football ==
- 1943–44 Swiss Cup
- 1943–44 Swiss 1. Liga

== Sources ==
- Switzerland 1943–44 at RSSSF

Preceded by 1942–43	Nationalliga seasons in Switzerland	Succeeded by 1944–45
