= Kurt Bertsch =

Swiss footballer (born 1921)

Personal information
- Full name: Kurt Bertsch
- Date of birth: 31 March 1921 (age 105)
- Place of birth: Switzerland
- Position: Striker

Senior career*
Years	Team	Apps	(Gls)
1939–1943	FC St. Gallen	56	(21)
1943–1946	FC Basel	41	(15)
1946–1952	FC St. Gallen	89	(51)
1952–1953	SC Young Fellows	14	(3)
- * Club domestic league appearances and goals

Kurt Bertsch (born 31 March 1921) is a Swiss former footballer who played in the 1940s and early 1950s. He played as a striker.

== Career ==
Bertsch played his youth football by St. Gallen and joined their first team for the 1939–40 Nationalliga season. He played for them for four seasons before moving on.

Bertsch joined Basel for their 1943–44 season. After playing in five test matches, he played his domestic league debut for his new club in the away game on 5 September 1943 as Basel played against Luzern. He scored his first goal for his new club in the same game as the two teams drew 1–1. Basel played a mediocre season, winning nine matches, drawing eight and suffered nine defeats they ended the domestic league season in 9th position. Bertsch played in 17 league games and scored two goals. In the same season Basel reached the Swiss Cup final. This was played on 10 April in Wankdorf Stadium in Bern against Lausanne-Sport. Lausanne scored three goals during the last five minutes of the match and won the cup. Bertsch played in all five cup games including the final.

The next season (1944–45) Basel suffered relegation. Bertsch played in only six games and scored four goals. In Basel's 1945–46 season Bertsch played regularly and helped Basel win the Nationalliga B group and gain promotion. Bertsch scored nine goals in 18 league appearances.

Between the years 1943 and 1946 Bertsch played a total of 66 games for Basel scoring a total of 31 goals. 41 of these games were in the Nationalliga, eight in the Swiss Cup and 17 were friendly games. He scored 15 goals in the domestic league, four goals in the cup and the other 12 were scored during the test games.

Following his three seasons for Basel, Bertsch returned to play for St. Gallen, who were playing second tier football. He stayed with them for five seasons. In the 1948–49 they won promotion, Bertsch played 20 games scoring seven goals. However, the next season they suffered immediate relegation, despite Betsch scoring 12 goals in 24 outings.

For the season 1952–1953 Bertsch moved on to play one season for Young Fellows Zürich. Bertsch then ended his active football career in which he played exactly 200 domestic league games and scored 90 goals.

== Sources ==
- Die ersten 125 Jahre. Publisher: Josef Zindel im Friedrich Reinhardt Verlag, Basel. ISBN 978-3-7245-2305-5
- Verein "Basler Fussballarchiv" Homepage
