= Willy Zingg =

Swiss footballer

Personal information
- Full name: Willy Zingg
- Date of birth: unknown
- Place of birth: Switzerland
- Date of death: 1968
- Position: Midfielder

Senior career*
Years	Team	Apps	(Gls)
1944–1951	FC Basel	6	(0)
- * Club domestic league appearances and goals

Willy Zingg (who died in 1968) was a Swiss footballer who played for FC Basel. Zingg played as midfielder.

Zingg joined Basel's first team during their 1944–45 season under team manager Max Barras. After playing only in test games in his first season, Zingg played his domestic league debut for the club in the home game at the Landhof on 23 September 1945 as Basel won 2–0 against Brühl St. Gallen.

Zingg played for Basel during six seasons. He played a total of 13 games for Basel without scoring a goal. Six of these games were in the Nationalliga, one in the Swiss Cup and six were friendly games.

== Sources ==
- Rotblau: Jahrbuch Saison 2017/2018. Publisher: FC Basel Marketing AG. ISBN 978-3-7245-2189-1
- Die ersten 125 Jahre. Publisher: Josef Zindel im Friedrich Reinhardt Verlag, Basel. ISBN 978-3-7245-2305-5
- Verein "Basler Fussballarchiv" Homepage

(NB: Despite all efforts, the editors of these books and the authors in "Basler Fussballarchiv" have failed to be able to identify all the players, their date and place of birth or date and place of death, who played in the games during the early years of FC Basel)
