= Hans Spengler =

Swiss footballer (1917-2003)

Personal information
- Full name: Hans Spengler
- Date of birth: 6 July 1917
- Place of birth: Switzerland
- Date of death: 19 June 2003 (aged 85)
- Place of death: St. Gallen, Switzerland
- Height: 1.81 m (5 ft 11 in)
- Position: Striker

Senior career*
Years	Team	Apps	(Gls)
1941–1942	SC Brühl St. Gallen		
1942	FC Basel	8	(0)
1942–1943	FC Zürich	10	(3)
1943–1947	SC Brühl St. Gallen	21	(10)
- * Club domestic league appearances and goals

Hans Spengler (6 July 1917 – 19 June 2003) was a Swiss footballer who played in the 1940s. He played as a striker.

Spengler played his early football for SC Brühl St. Gallen. He joined Basel's first team for their 1942–43 season under player-manager Eugen Rupf. After playing two test games, Spengler played his domestic league debut for his new club in the away game on 6 September 1942 as Basel were defeated 0–6 by Grasshopper Club. Basel played a bad season and during the winter break Spengler moved on.

In the six months that he was by the club Spengler played a total of ten games for Basel scoring a total of four goals. Eight of these games were in the Nationalliga and two were friendly games. He scored all four goals in the two test games.

Spengler joined FC Zürich and played the rest of the 1942–43 Nationalliga for them. Spengler played his domestic league debut for Zürich in the away game on 27 December 1942 as they won 2–0 against Young Boys. He played ten league games for the club scoring three goals. He played two games in the Swiss Cup, scoring one goal, and played one test match, in which he scored a hat-trick against Luzern as Zürich won by six goals to one.

Following his time in Zürich Spengler returned to Brühl St. Gallen.

== Sources ==
- Rotblau: Jahrbuch Saison 2017/2018. Publisher: FC Basel Marketing AG. ISBN 978-3-7245-2189-1
- Die ersten 125 Jahre. Publisher: Josef Zindel im Friedrich Reinhardt Verlag, Basel. ISBN 978-3-7245-2305-5
- Verein "Basler Fussballarchiv" Homepage

(NB: Despite all efforts, the editors of these books and the authors in "Basler Fussballarchiv" have failed to be able to identify all the players, their date and place of birth or date and place of death, who played in the games during the early years of FC Basel)
