= Hans Rothen =

Swiss footballer

Personal information
- Full name: Hans Rothen
- Date of birth: unknown
- Place of birth: Switzerland
- Date of death: unknown
- Position: Goalkeeper

Senior career*
Years	Team	Apps	(Gls)
1948–1949	FC Basel	1	(0)
- * Club domestic league appearances and goals

Hans Rothen was a Swiss footballer who played for FC Basel as goalkeeper.

Rothen joined Basel's first team in their 1946–47 season. He played his domestic league debut for the club in the away game on 4 May 1947 as Basel drew 1–1 against FC Bern. He was their reserve goalkeeper and was substituted in after first goalkeeper Walter Müller was injured.

During this season Rothen played a total of two games for Basel. The other game was a friendly game against RC Strasbourg.

== Sources ==
- Rotblau: Jahrbuch Saison 2017/2018. Publisher: FC Basel Marketing AG. ISBN 978-3-7245-2189-1
- Die ersten 125 Jahre. Publisher: Josef Zindel im Friedrich Reinhardt Verlag, Basel. ISBN 978-3-7245-2305-5
- Verein "Basler Fussballarchiv" Homepage

(NB: Despite all efforts, the editors of these books and the authors in "Basler Fussballarchiv" have failed to be able to identify all the players, their date and place of birth or date and place of death, who played in the games during the early years of FC Basel)
