= Max Gloor =

Swiss footballer

Personal information
- Full name: Max Gloor
- Place of birth: Switzerland
- Position: Striker

Senior career*
Years	Team	Apps	(Gls)
1943–1945	FC Basel	4	(2)
- * Club domestic league appearances and goals

Max Gloor was a Swiss footballer who played for FC Basel as a forward.

Gloor joined Basel's first team for their 1943–44 season. He played his domestic league debut for the club in the home game at the Landhof on 20 February 1944 as Basel played a 1–1 draw against Luzern. He scored his first goal for his club on 11 June in the home game against St. Gallen. It was the last goal of the game as Basel won 6–1.

During the two seasons that he was with Basel, Gloor played eight games for them scoring four goals. Four of these games were in the Nationalliga and four were friendly games. He scored two goals in the domestic league, the other two were scored during the test games.

== Sources ==
- Rotblau: Jahrbuch Saison 2017/2018. Publisher: FC Basel Marketing AG. ISBN 978-3-7245-2189-1
- Die ersten 125 Jahre. Publisher: Josef Zindel im Friedrich Reinhardt Verlag, Basel. ISBN 978-3-7245-2305-5
- Verein "Basler Fussballarchiv" Homepage

(NB: Despite all efforts, the editors of these books and the authors in "Basler Fussballarchiv" have failed to be able to identify all the players, their date and place of birth or date and place of death, who played in the games during the early years of FC Basel)
