= Fritz Greder =

Swiss footballer

Personal information
- Full name: Fritz Greder
- Position: Defender

Senior career*
| Years | Team | Apps | (Gls) |
| 1940–1942 | FC Allschwil | | |
| 1942–1943 | FC Basel | 16 | (0) |
- * Club domestic league appearances and goals

Fritz Greder was a Swiss footballer who played as defender in the 1940s.

Greder first played for lower tier FC Allschwil. He then joined Basel's first team before their 1942–43 season. He played his domestic league debut for the club in the away game on 13 September 1942 as Basel against Lausanne-Sport.

During the season with Basel Greder played a total of 20 games for Basel without scoring a goal. 16 of these games were in the Swiss Serie A, three in the Swiss Cup and one was a friendly game.

== Sources ==
- Rotblau: Jahrbuch Saison 2017/2018. Publisher: FC Basel Marketing AG. ISBN 978-3-7245-2189-1
- Die ersten 125 Jahre. Publisher: Josef Zindel im Friedrich Reinhardt Verlag, Basel. ISBN 978-3-7245-2305-5
- Verein "Basler Fussballarchiv" Homepage
