= Erich Andres (footballer) =

Swiss footballer (1920-1999)

Personal information
- Full name: Erich Andres
- Date of birth: 31 July 1920
- Date of death: 1999 (aged 78–79)
- Position: Forward

Senior career*
Years	Team	Apps	(Gls)
–1941	FC Wettingen		
1941–1943	FC Zürich	20	(20)
1942–1943	FC Basel	14	(5)
1943–1945	Young Fellows Zürich	46	(32)
1945–1947	FC Wettingen		
1947–1951	FC Zürich	74	(40)

International career
1942	Switzerland	1	(0)
- * Club domestic league appearances and goals

Erich Andres (31 July 1920 – 1999) was a Swiss footballer who played in the 1940s and early 1950s. He played as a forward.

Andres played his early football for FC Wettingen and moved on to FC Zürich for the 1941–42 Nationalliga season.

A bit more than a year later, in December 1942, he joined Basel's first team for the second hald of their 1942–43 season. He played his domestic league debut for his new club in the away game on 20 December 1942 as Basel were defeated 1–9 by Servette. He scored his first goal for the club one week later on 27 December in the home game at the Landhof against St. Gallen as Basel won 2–1. During the six months that he was with Basel, Andres played 17 games scoring seven goals; 14 games were in the Nationalliga and three were in the Swiss Cup. He scored five goals in the domestic league, the other two were scored in the cup competition.

For the 1943–44 Nationalliga season Andres moved on to Young Fellows Zürich. At the end of the season they finished the league in 11th position and Andres had scored 23 of the team's 46 goals. With this tally he was the league's top goal scorer. Andres played a second season for Young Fellows. In the 1945–46 season Andres moved back to his home team FC Wettingen for his second period with them. He stayed with them for two seasons and then rejoined FC Zürich where he ended his active football career.

Andres was called up to the Swiss national team in the 1942–43 season by team manager Karl Rappan. Andres played his national team debut on 1 November 1942. Switzerland were the guests in the Stadion Albert Flórián in Budapest against Hungary. The game ended with a three–nil victory for the hosts.

== Sources ==
- Rotblau: Jahrbuch Saison 2017/2018. Publisher: FC Basel Marketing AG. ISBN 978-3-7245-2189-1
- Die ersten 125 Jahre. Publisher: Josef Zindel im Friedrich Reinhardt Verlag, Basel. ISBN 978-3-7245-2305-5
- Verein "Basler Fussballarchiv" Homepage
