= Hans Nyffeler =

Swiss footballer

Personal information
- Full name: Hans Nyffeler
- Place of birth: Switzerland
- Position: Forward

Senior career*
Years	Team	Apps	(Gls)
1943–1945	FC Basel	16	(1)
- * Club domestic league appearances and goals

Hans Nyffeler was a Swiss footballer who played for FC Basel as a forward.

Nyffeler joined Basel's first team during their 1943–44 season. After one test match he made his domestic league debut for the club in the away game on 5 September 1943 as Basel drew 1–1 with Luzern. He scored his first goal for his club on 26 September in the away game against Lausanne-Sport as Basel were defeated 1–4.

During his two seasons with Basel, Nyffeler played 22 games and scored eight goals; 16 games were in the Swiss Serie A and 6 were friendly games. He scored one goal in the domestic league and the other seven during the test games.

== Sources ==
- Rotblau: Jahrbuch Saison 2017/2018. Publisher: FC Basel Marketing AG. ISBN 978-3-7245-2189-1
- Die ersten 125 Jahre. Publisher: Josef Zindel im Friedrich Reinhardt Verlag, Basel. ISBN 978-3-7245-2305-5
- Verein "Basler Fussballarchiv" Homepage

(NB: Despite all efforts, the editors of these books and the authors in "Basler Fussballarchiv" have failed to be able to identify all the players, their date and place of birth or date and place of death, who played in the games during the early years of FC Basel)
