= Karl von Arx =

Swiss footballer (1921-1982)

Tschüppeli
Personal information
- Full name: Karl von Arx
- Date of birth: 1921
- Place of birth: Switzerland
- Date of death: 1982 (aged 60–61)
- Position: Midfielder

Senior career*
Years	Team	Apps	(Gls)
1942–1946	FC Basel	31	(1)
- * Club domestic league appearances and goals

Karl von Arx, commonly known by his pseudonym Tschüppeli, (* 1921; † 1982) was a Swiss footballer who played in the 1940s. He played as midfielder.

Von Arx joined Basel's first team during their 1942–43 season. He played his domestic league debut for the club in the away game on 25 October 1942 against Lugano. He scored his first goal for his club on 21 March 1943 in the away game against Cantonal Neuchatel. But this could not save Basel from a 2–3 defeat.

Between the years 1942 and 1943 von Arx played a total of 46 games for Basel scoring a total of four goals. 31 of these games were in the Nationalliga, four in the Swiss Cup and 11 were friendly games. He scored one goal in the domestic league, the others were scored during the test games.

== Sources ==
- Rotblau: Jahrbuch Saison 2017/2018. Publisher: FC Basel Marketing AG. ISBN 978-3-7245-2189-1
- Die ersten 125 Jahre. Publisher: Josef Zindel im Friedrich Reinhardt Verlag, Basel. ISBN 978-3-7245-2305-5
- Verein "Basler Fussballarchiv" Homepage

(NB: Despite all efforts, the editors of these books and the authors in "Basler Fussballarchiv" have failed to be able to identify all the players, their date and place of birth or date and place of death, who played in the games during the early years of FC Basel)
