= Heinz Elsässer =

Swiss footballer (born 1917)

Personal information
- Full name: Heinz Elsässer
- Date of birth: 11 March 1917
- Place of birth: Switzerland
- Date of death: unknown
- Position: Midfielder

Senior career*
Years	Team	Apps	(Gls)
1935–1947	FC Basel	154	(2)
- * Club domestic league appearances and goals

Heinz Elsässer (born 11 March 1917) was a Swiss footballer who played for FC Basel in the second half of the 1930s and in the 1940s. He played mainly as midfielder, but also as defender.

Elsässer played youth football by FC Basel. He joined their first team at the beginning of their 1935–36 season. He played his domestic league debut for the club as defender in the away game on 1 September 1935 as Basel won 4–2 against Aarau. He scored his first goal for his club on 3 January 1937 in the home game at the Landhof against Grasshopper Club. It was the first goal of the game, a penalty kick, as Basel won 2–0.

Elsässer played twelve seasons for Basel. In the season 1938/39 Elsässer and his team suffered relegation to the 1 Liga. Although Basel were 1 Liga champions the following season, there was no relegation and no promotion due to the second World War. Again in the 1940/41 season Basel won their 1 Liga group, but in the promotion play-offs Basel were defeated by Cantonal Neuchatel and drew the game with Zürich. Their two play-off opponents were thus promoted and Basel remained for another season in the 1 Liga.

In the season 1941/42 Basel were winners of the 1 Liga group East and played a play-off for promotion of the 1 Liga group West, FC Bern. After a goalless first leg away from home, Basel won the return leg 3–1 and achieved promotion. In this same season Elsässer and his team also qualified for the Swiss Cup final. This was played on 6 April 1942 in the Wankdorf Stadion against the Nationalliga team Grasshopper Club. The final ended goalless after extra time and thus a replay was required. The replay was on 25 May, again in the Wankdorf Stadion. Basel led by half time 2–0, Fritz Schmidlin had scored both goals, but after the break two goals from Grubenmann and a third from Neukom gave the Grasshoppers a 3–2 victory.

Three years later, in the season 1944/45 Basel were again relegated from the newly arranged Nationalliga A to the Nationalliga B. But Elsässer and his team achieved immediate promotion as Nationalliga B champions a year later. During his last season as active footballer 1946/47 Elsässer played only one game, the team finished the championship in 4th position and won the Swiss Cup final against Lausanne-Sport by three goals to nil.

Between the years 1935 and 1947 Elsässer played a total of 215 games for Basel scoring two goals. 154 of these games were in the Nationalliga and 1st League, 16 in the Swiss Cup and 45 were friendly games. He scored both his goals in the domestic league.

== Sources ==
- Rotblau: Jahrbuch Saison 2017/2018. Publisher: FC Basel Marketing AG. ISBN 978-3-7245-2189-1
- Die ersten 125 Jahre. Publisher: Josef Zindel im Friedrich Reinhardt Verlag, Basel. ISBN 978-3-7245-2305-5
- Verein "Basler Fussballarchiv" Homepage
