= Rudolf Knup =

Swiss footballer

Personal information
- Full name: Rudolf Knup
- Place of birth: Switzerland
- Position: Forward

Senior career*
Years	Team	Apps	(Gls)
1940–1941	FC Black Stars Basel		
1941–1944	FC Basel	14	(1)
- * Club domestic league appearances and goals

Rudolf Knup was a Swiss footballer who played in the 1940s as a forward.

Knup played his early football for Black Stars. He joined Basel's first team for their 1941–42 season as they played in the 1. Liga under player-manager Eugen Rupf. After one test match, Knup made his domestic league debut for the club in the home game at the Landhof on 31 August 1941 as Basel won 10–1 against SC Juventus Zürich. He scored his first goal for his club on 12 October in the home game against Chiasso as Basel won 4–0. Basel finished their season as winners of group East and qualified promotion play-offs against group West winners FC Bern. The 1st leg was the away tie, this ended with a goalless draw. Basel won the second leg at home 3–1 to achieve promotion.

From 1941 to 1944 Knup played 19 games for Basel scoring that one goal; 14 of these games were in the 1. Liga or Nationalliga and five were friendly games.

== Sources ==
- Rotblau: Jahrbuch Saison 2017/2018. Publisher: FC Basel Marketing AG. ISBN 978-3-7245-2189-1
- Die ersten 125 Jahre. Publisher: Josef Zindel im Friedrich Reinhardt Verlag, Basel. ISBN 978-3-7245-2305-5
- Verein "Basler Fussballarchiv" Homepage

(NB: Despite all efforts, the editors of these books and the authors in "Basler Fussballarchiv" have failed to be able to identify all the players, their date and place of birth or date and place of death, who played in the games during the early years of FC Basel)
