= Rudolf Wirz (footballer) =

Swiss footballer (1918-1988)

Personal information
- Full name: Rudolf Wirz
- Date of birth: 1918
- Place of birth: Switzerland
- Date of death: 5 November 1988 (aged 69–70)
- Place of death: Basel, Switzerland
- Position: Midfielder

Senior career*
Years	Team	Apps	(Gls)
1941–1948	FC Basel	51	(1)
- * Club domestic league appearances and goals

Rudolf Wirz (1918 – 5 November 1988) was a Swiss footballer who played for FC Basel. He played as midfielder.

Wirz joined Basel's first team in their 1941–42 season as they played in the 1. Liga under player-manager Eugen Rupf. Wirz played his domestic league debut for the club in the home game at the Landhof on 12 October 1941 as Basel won 4–0 against Chiasso. Basel finished their season as winners of group East and qualified promotion play-offs against group West winners FC Bern. The 1st leg was the away tie, this ended with a goalless draw. Basel won the 2nd leg at home at the Landhof 3–1 to achieve Promotion.

Between the years 1941 and 1948 Wirz played a total of 81 games for Basel without scoring a goal. 51 of these games were in the Swiss Serie A, 11 in the Swiss Cup and 19 were friendly games.

== Sources ==
- Rotblau: Jahrbuch Saison 2017/2018. Publisher: FC Basel Marketing AG. ISBN 978-3-7245-2189-1
- Die ersten 125 Jahre. Publisher: Josef Zindel im Friedrich Reinhardt Verlag, Basel. ISBN 978-3-7245-2305-5
- Verein "Basler Fussballarchiv" Homepage
