= Ernst Grauer =

Swiss footballer (1913-2006)

Personal information
- Full name: Ernst Grauer
- Date of birth: 2 October 1913
- Place of birth: Switzerland
- Date of death: 6 May 2006 (aged 92)
- Place of death: Switzerland
- Position: Defender

Youth career
- until 1930: FC Basel

Senior career*
Years	Team	Apps	(Gls)
1930–1933	FC Basel	8	(2)
1933–1935	Concordia Basel	49	(5)
1935–1948	FC Basel	226	(7)
1948–1949	Grasshopper Club	18	(0)
1949–1951	Nordstern Basel	52	(0)
- * Club domestic league appearances and goals

Ernst Grauer (2 October 1913 – 6 May 2006) was a Swiss footballer who played for FC Basel in the 1930s and 1940s. He played as defender. He also played two seasons for Concordia Basel and toward the end of his active career he played one season for Grasshopper Club. Grauer ended his active football career playing two seasons for Nordstern Basel in the early 1950s.

== Football career ==
Grauer played his youth football for FC Basel and joined their first team in 1930. After playing two test games, Grauer played his domestic league debut for the club in the home game at the Landhof on 19 April 1931 as Basel won 3–0 against Concordia Basel. He scored his first goal for his club in the very next game on 26 April. It was the last goal of the away as Basel won 3–1 against FC Bern.

During the next two seasons Grauer did not get much playing time with Basel. So, to obtain playing experience, he moved for two seasons to FC Concordia Basel. Here he played in the starting eleven right from the very beginning. In these two seasons Grauer played 49 of the 52 league games, scoring five goals. In the match against his former team on 28 April 1935 Grauer scored the Concordia's second goal as his actual team beat Basel by two goals to one. However, this goal, this win did not save Concordia from relegation from the 1934–35 Nationalliga to the 1 Liga.

Grauer returned to Basel and played here until 1948. In the season 1938/39 Grauer and the team suffered relegation to the 1 Liga. Although Basel were 1 Liga champions the following season, there was no relegation and no promotion due to the second World War. Again in the 1940/41 season Basel won their 1 Liga group, but in the promotion play-offs Basel were defeated by Cantonal Neuchatel and drew the game with Zürich. Their two play-off opponents were thus promoted and Basel remained for another season in the 1 Liga. In the season 1941/42 Basel were winners of the 1 Liga group East and played a play-off for promotion of the 1 Liga group West, FC Bern. After a goalless game away from home, Basel won the return leg 3–1 and achieved promotion.

Three years later, in the season 1944/45 Basel were again relegated, from the newly arranged Nationalliga A to the Nationalliga B. But they achieved immediate promotion as Nationalliga B champions a year later. Grauer's biggest success came in the next season. Grauer was captain of the team as they reached the Swiss Cup final in Basel's 1946–47 season. They won the final 3–0 against Lausanne Sports. In the Stadion Neufeld, in Bern, on 7 April 1947 with Paul Stöcklin scoring all three goals.

During the seasons 1930/31 to 1932/33 and again in the period between the seasons 1935/36 to 1947/48 Grauer played a total of 339 games for Basel scoring a total of 11 goals. 234 of these games were in the Swiss Serie A or 1 Liga, 40 in the Swiss Cup and 65 were friendly games. He scored seven goals in the domestic league, two goals in the Swiss Cup and the other two were scored during the test games.

In the summer of 1948, toward the end of his active career, Grauer moved on to Grasshopper Club and he played there for one season. Grauer ended his active football career playing two seasons for Nordstern Basel. In both seasons by Nordstern he played in all the domestic league games.

After his active career, he coached the interregional FCB juniors up until 1966. Until his death, he was stayed associated with the club and their first team.

== Titles and Honours ==
FC Basel

- Swiss Cup winner: 1946–47
- 1 Liga champions: 1939–40, 1941–42, 1945–46

== Sources ==
- Rotblau: Jahrbuch Saison 2017/2018. Publisher: FC Basel Marketing AG. ISBN 978-3-7245-2189-1
- Die ersten 125 Jahre. Publisher: Josef Zindel im Friedrich Reinhardt Verlag, Basel. ISBN 978-3-7245-2305-5
- Verein "Basler Fussballarchiv" Homepage
