= Alberto Losa =

Swiss footballer (born 1917)

Personal information
- Full name: Alberto Losa
- Date of birth: 1917
- Place of birth: Switzerland
- Position: Midfielder

Senior career*
Years	Team	Apps	(Gls)
1938–1940	FC Nordstern Basel	42	(8)
1940–1941	FC Locarno		
1941–1945	FC Basel	84	(5)
1945–1951	FC Locarno	76	(10)
1951–1952	FC Mendrisio	26	(1)
- * Club domestic league appearances and goals

Alberto Losa (born 1917) was a Swiss footballer who played in the late 1930s, 1940s and early 1950s. He played as midfielder.

Losa first played at least two seasons for Nordstern Basel. He then moved for the first time to Locarno.

Losa joined Basel's first team in their 1940–41 season. He made his debut for his new club in the Swiss Cup on 21 December 1941 in a home game at the Landhof that Basel won 3–0 against Young Boys. He played his domestic league debut for the club in the home game at the Landhof on 18 January 1942 against Schaffhausen. He scored his first goal for his club in the same game, in fact he scored twice as Basel won 11–0. His teammate Erhard Grieder scored five times in that game. Basel finished their season as winners of group East. The promotion play-offs were then against group West winners FC Bern. The 1st leg was the away tie, this ended with a goalless draw. Basel won the 2nd leg at home at the Landhof 3–1 and Losa achieved Promotion with his team. In the cup Basel advanced to the final, which ended goalless after extra time and a replay was required. This was held on 25 May 1942, in the Wankdorf Stadion, against the new Nationalliga champions Grasshoppers. Basel led by half time through two goals by Fritz Schmidlin, but two goals from Grubenmann a third from Neukom gave the Grasshoppers a 3–2 victory. Losa played in six cup matches including the final and the replay.

Between the years 1941 and 1945 Losa played a total of 119 games for Basel scoring a total of eight goals. 84 of these games were in the 1. Liga and Nationalliga, 15 in the Swiss Cup and 20 were friendly games. He scored five goals in the domestic league, one in the cup and the others were scored during the test games.

After his time playing for Basel Losa returned to Locarno where he stayed for five seasons. He then moved on to play for FC Mendrisio where he ended his active football playing time.

== Sources ==
- Rotblau: Jahrbuch Saison 2017/2018. Publisher: FC Basel Marketing AG. ISBN 978-3-7245-2189-1
- Die ersten 125 Jahre. Publisher: Josef Zindel im Friedrich Reinhardt Verlag, Basel. ISBN 978-3-7245-2305-5
- Verein "Basler Fussballarchiv" Homepage

(NB: Despite all efforts, the editors of these books and the authors in "Basler Fussballarchiv" have failed to be able to identify all the players, their date and place of birth or date and place of death, who played in the games during the early years of FC Basel)
