= Alexander Ebner (footballer) =

Swiss footballer

Personal information
- Full name: Alexander Ebner
- Date of birth: unknown
- Place of birth: Switzerland
- Date of death: unknown
- Position: Midfielder

Senior career*
Years	Team	Apps	(Gls)
1939–1947	FC Basel	92	(11)
1947–1951	Cantonal Neuchatel	78	(5)
- * Club domestic league appearances and goals

Alexander Ebner was a Swiss footballer who played during the 1940s. He played as midfielder.

Ebner joined Basel's first team during their 1939–40 season. He played his domestic league debut for the club in the away game on 16 June 1940 as Basel drew 1–1 against Concordia Basel. Although Basel were 1 Liga champions that season, there was no relegation and no promotion due to the second World War. Again in the 1940–41 season Basel won their 1 Liga group, but in the promotion play-offs Basel were defeated by Cantonal Neuchatel and drew the game with Zürich. Their two play-off opponents were thus promoted and Basel remained for another season in the 1 Liga.

In the season 1941–42 Basel were winners of the 1 Liga group East and played a play-off for promotion of the 1 Liga group West, FC Bern. After a goalless first leg away from home, Basel won the return leg 3–1 and achieved promotion.

It was in the Nationalliga 1942–43 season that Ebner became a regular player for the team. He scored his first goal for his club on 31 October 1943 in the home game at the Landhof against Grasshopper Club as Basel won 2–1. In the season 1944–45 Ebner with his team were again relegated, from the newly arranged Nationalliga A to the Nationalliga B. But the team achieved immediate promotion as Nationalliga B champions a year later. Ebner played one more season for the club before he moved on.

Ebner played eight seasons for Basel. Between the years 1939 and 1947 Ebner played a total of 127 games for Basel scoring a total of 17 goals. 92 of these games were in the Swiss Serie A, 10 in the Swiss Cup and 25 were friendly games. He scored 11 goal in the domestic league, four in the cup and the other two were scored during the test games.

Ebner then signed for Cantonal Neuchatel and played for them for four seasons before he retired from active football.

== Sources ==
- Rotblau: Jahrbuch Saison 2017/2018. Publisher: FC Basel Marketing AG. ISBN 978-3-7245-2189-1
- Die ersten 125 Jahre. Publisher: Josef Zindel im Friedrich Reinhardt Verlag, Basel. ISBN 978-3-7245-2305-5
- Verein "Basler Fussballarchiv" Homepage

(NB: Despite all efforts, the editors of these books and the authors in "Basler Fussballarchiv" have failed to be able to identify all the players, their date and place of birth or date and place of death, who played in the games during the early years of FC Basel)
