= Rodolfo Kappenberger =

Swiss footballer (1917-2012)

Personal information
- Date of birth: 6 October 1917
- Place of birth: Lugano, Switzerland
- Date of death: 11 May 2012 (aged 94)
- Place of death: Magliaso, Switzerland
- Position: Forward

Youth career
- –1936: FC Lugano
- 1936–1937: SC Zug

Senior career*
Years	Team	Apps	(Gls)
1936–1939	SC Zug		
1939–1941	FC Lugano	37	(17)
1941–1948	FC Basel	100	(31)

International career
1941–1942	Switzerland	6	(5)
- * Club domestic league appearances and goals

Rodolfo Kappenberger (6 October 1917 – 11 May 2012) was a Swiss international footballer.

== Career ==
=== Club ===
The birthplace of Rodolfo Kappenberger was Lugano, which is why he played his youth football at the former stadium Campo Marzio with FC Lugano. He later moved to Zug to learn the German language and while here Kappenberger joined SC Zug, who at that time played in the second tier of Swiss football. He then returned home and again played for Lugano for another two seasons between 1939 and 1941.

In 1941, aged 24, Kappenberger moved to Basel to study dentistry, which meant that FC Basel, who were then only playing in the second highest league, acquired a talented and elegant winger without a transfer fee and for a modest salary. He joined Basel's first team for their 1941–42 season under player-coach Eugen Rupf. Kappenberger played his domestic league debut for the club in the home game in the Landhof on 31 August 1941. Rupf scored the first goal, Alex Mathys scored seven goals, Joseph Bossi added one and Kappenberger himself also netted one as Basel played a dominating 10–1 win against SC Juventus Zürich. The team played a very dominating season, they ended the eastern group of the 1st League group as winners and in the Swiss Cup they advanced to the final and were only beaten after they lost the replay. Kappenberger was the team’s best goal scorer with 14 goals in the league and two in the cup. In the league play-off match against the western group winners FC Bern 1894 Kappenberger scored the first goal as they won 3–1 to achieve promotion.

Basel suffered relegation at the end of their 1944–45 season, but they became Nationalliga B champions the following year, thus winning promotion to return to the top tier of Swiss football. Kappenberger remained loyal to FCB until the summer of 1948. He reached the cup final three times during his seven years with RotBlau. The team were defeated twice, 1942 against Grasshopper Club and 1944 against Lausanne-Sport. But the cup final from 1947 was won 3–0 against Lausanne.

Between the years 1941 and 1948 Kappenberger played a total of 127 games for Basel scoring a total of 42 goals. 100 of these games were in the Swiss Super League, 19 in the Swiss Cup and eight were friendly games. He scored 31 goals in the domestic league, six in the cupand the other five were scored during the test games.

=== International ===
Kappenberger also played six games for the Switzerland national team in which he scored five goals.

He gave his debut on 28 December 1941 in the Mestalla Stadium in Valencia, as Spain beat the Swiss by 3–2. Kappenberger scored his team’s first goal, which was the intermediate equaliser to one goal each.

He also scored two goals in the 2–1 away win on 1 February 1942 against Germany in the Praterstadion in Vienna.

== Private life ==
After his dental studium Kappenberger became dentist. In 1948, Kappenberger ended his football career to concentrate on his job as a dentist. As a result, he maintained a practice Basel for four decades until his retirement. He married Franziska and the couple had a son. The couple then moved their residence, first partially and then completely, to the canton of Ticino. He died in Magliasoon 11 May 2012.

== Honours and Titles ==
- Swiss Cup winner: 1947
- Second division champions and promotion: 1941–42, 1945–46

== Sources ==
- Josef Zindel (2018). FC Basel 1893. Die ersten 125 Jahre (in German). Basel: Friedrich Reinhardt Verlag. ISBN 978-3-7245-2305-5.
- Verein "Basler Fussballarchiv" Homepage
