= Alfred Weisshaar =

Swiss footballer

Personal information
- Full name: Alfred Weisshaar
- Place of birth: Switzerland
- Position: Forward

Senior career*
| Years | Team | Apps | (Gls) |
| 1943–1948 | FC Basel | 32 | (17) |
- * Club domestic league appearances and goals

Alfred Weisshaar was a Swiss footballer who played for FC Basel in the 1940s as a forward.

Weisshaar joined Basel's first team in their 1943–44 season. He made his domestic league debut for the club in the away game on 17 October 1943 as Basel were defeated 0–2 by Cantonal Neuchatel. He scored his first goal for his club one week later on 24 October. It was the equaliser as Basel drew 1–1 in the away game against Servette. He scored his first hat-trick for the club in the Swiss Cup match on 13 February 1944 as Basel won 5–1 at home in the Landhof against Young Boys. He also scored a hat-trick in the league game against St. Gallen as Basel won by six goals to one. Weisshaar ended that season as the team's top league goal scorer with 15 goals.

In the following seasons, Weisshaar only played very few games. In the season 1944–45 Weisshaar and his team were again relegated, from the newly arranged Nationalliga A to the Nationalliga B. Weisshaar played only four league games that season. The team achieved immediate promotion as Nationalliga B champions a year later, but Weisshaar did not play in the Nationalliga B. In the following two years Weisshaar only managed three league games in each season.

Between 1943 and 1948, Weisshaar played a total of 59 games for Basel scoring a total of 29 goals; 32 of these games were in the Nationalliga A, eight in the Swiss Cup and 19 were friendly games. He scored 17 goal in the domestic league, three in the cup and the other nine were scored during the test games.

== Sources ==
- Rotblau: Jahrbuch Saison 2017/2018. Publisher: FC Basel Marketing AG. ISBN 978-3-7245-2189-1
- Die ersten 125 Jahre. Publisher: Josef Zindel im Friedrich Reinhardt Verlag, Basel. ISBN 978-3-7245-2305-5
- Verein "Basler Fussballarchiv" Homepage

(NB: Despite all efforts, the editors of these books and the authors in "Basler Fussballarchiv" have failed to be able to identify all the players, their date and place of birth or date and place of death, who played in the games during the early years of FC Basel)
