= Hans Vonthron =

Swiss footballer

Personal information
- Full name: Hans Vonthron
- Date of birth: unknown
- Place of birth: Switzerland
- Date of death: 1989
- Position: Midfielder

Senior career*
Years	Team	Apps	(Gls)
1936–1937	FC Concordia Basel		
1940–1948	FC Basel	147	(12)
- * Club domestic league appearances and goals

Hans Vonthron (* unknown; † 1989) was a Swiss footballer who played in the late 1930s and the 1940s. He played as midfielder.

Vonthron first played for FC Concordia Basel. He joined Basel's first team during their 1940–41 season as they played in the 1. Liga und player-manager Eugen Rupf. He played his domestic league debut for his new club in the home game at the Landhof on 15 September 1940 as Basel won 3–1 against FC Birsfelden. He scored his first goal for his club on 4 May 1941 in the away game against exactly the same opponents in the last game of that season. Basel won the game 3–1 and this victory assured the team the qualification to the promotion play-offs. But in these play-offs Basel were defeated by Cantonal Neuchatel and drew the game with Zürich. Their two play-off opponents were thus promoted and Basel remained for another season in the 1 Liga.

The following year Basel started the 1941–42 league season well. Basel finished their season as winners of group East. The promotion play-offs were then against group West winners FC Bern. The 1st leg was the away tie, this ended with a goalless draw. Basel won the 2nd leg at home at the Landhof 3–1 to achieve Promotion. Vonthron played in nearly all of the league games and in all ten cup matches. Again FC Birsfelden turned out to be one of Vonthron's favourite opponents. In both the league match on 9 November as well as in the cup game on 7 December Vonthron was able to score a valuable goal. In the cup Basel advanced to the final, which ended goalless after extra time and a replay was required. This was held on 25 May 1942, in the Wankdorf Stadion, against the new Nationalliga champions Grasshoppers. Basel led by half time through two goals by Fritz Schmidlin, but two goals from Grubenmann a third from Neukom gave the Grasshoppers a 3–2 victory.

Between the years 1940 and 1948 Vonthron played a total of 206 games for Basel scoring a total of 19 goals. 147 of these games were in the 1. Liga and Nationalliga, 35 in the Swiss Cup and 24 were friendly games. He scored 12 goals in the domestic league, five in the cup and the other two were scored during the test games.

As was customary at that time, the players were amateurs and pursued a civil profession. Vonthron was a heating oil and coal merchant.

== Sources ==
- Rotblau: Jahrbuch Saison 2017/2018. Publisher: FC Basel Marketing AG. ISBN 978-3-7245-2189-1
- Die ersten 125 Jahre. Publisher: Josef Zindel im Friedrich Reinhardt Verlag, Basel. ISBN 978-3-7245-2305-5
- Verein "Basler Fussballarchiv" Homepage

(NB: Despite all efforts, the editors of these books and the authors in "Basler Fussballarchiv" have failed to be able to identify all the players, their date and place of birth or date and place of death, who played in the games during the early years of FC Basel)
