= 1946–47 Swiss Cup =

Tournament details
- Country: Switzerland

Final positions
- Champions: Basel
- Runners-up: Lausanne Sport

The 1946–47 Swiss Cup was the 22nd season of Switzerland's football cup competition, organised annually since the 1925–26 season by the Swiss Football Association.

== Overview ==
This season's cup competition began with the first round, which was played on the week-end of the 22 September 1946. The competition was to be completed on Easter Monday, 7 April 1947, with the final, which, since 1937, was traditionally held in the country's capital, however this time at the Stadion Neufeld. The clubs from the 1946–47 Swiss 1. Liga were given a bye for the first round, they joined the competition in the second round on the week-end of 20 October. The clubs from this season's Nationalliga A (NLA) and from this season's Nationalliga B (NLB) were given byes for the first two rounds. These teams joined the competition in the third round, which was played on the week-end of 17 November.

The matches were played in a knockout format. In the event of a draw after 90 minutes, the match went into extra time. In the event of a draw at the end of extra time, a replay was foreseen and this was played on the visiting team's pitch. If the replay ended in a draw after extra time, a second replay was required. Should the second replay also end in a draw after extra time, a toss of a coin would establish the team that qualified for the next round.

== Round 1 ==
In the first round, the lower league teams that had qualified themselves for the competition through their regional football association's own regional cup competitions or had achieved their association's requirements, competed here. Whenever possible, the draw respected local regionalities. The games of the first round were played on Saturday 22 September 1946.

=== Summary ===
Team 1	Score	Team 2
22 September 1946
FC Trimbach	FF * Awd 0–3	Wacker Grenchen
FC Phönix (Winterthur)	0–4	FC Amriswil
FC Wetzikon	1–0 (a.e.t.)	SV Seebach
SV Höngg	3–4 (a.e.t.)	FC Stäfa (ZH)
FC Widnau	1–0	Chur
FC Lachen	2–4	FC Wil
FC Längasse (Bern)	4–1	FC Mett
FC Schönbühl	1–3	FC Victoria Bern
FC Breitenbach	1–4	Binningen
FC Horgen	2–0	SC Balerna
US Giubiasco	6–1	FC Altdorf (Uri)
Emmenbrücke	1–4	Luzerner SC
FC Yverdon	0–2	FC Ambrosiana Lausanne
Bulle	2–5	CS La Tour-de-Peilz
FC Villeneuve	3–3 (a.e.t.)	Sion
FC Chalais	1–2	FC Saint-Léonard
Vignoble Cully	2–1	Monthey
FC Le Sentier	3–1	FC Fontainemelon
Sainte-Croix Sports	3–0	Couvet-Sports
FC Aurore Bienne	2–1	FC Auvernier/Hauterive
Minerva Bern	2–1	FC Aegerten Brügg
SC Subingen	3–5	FC Tramelan
Burgdorf	2–1	FC Post Bern
Delémont	3–1	FC Reconvilier
FC Lenzburg	6–2	Sporting Aarau
FC Niedergösgen	0–4	Baden
TC Turgi	2–1	FC Muhen
FC Stein am Rhein	1–3	FC Neuhausen
FC Münchenstein	4–0	Rotschwarz Basel
SV Sissach	0–1	FC Allschwil
FC Diana Zürich	0–4	FC Tössfeld
FC OberWinterthur	1–2 (a.e.t.)	FC Oerlikon
FC Adliswil	2–3	FC Langnau am Albis
Frauenfeld	2–0	FC Winkeln St.Gallen
Chênois	1–5	ES Malley
Abattoirs Genève	1–2	Rhexia Campagnes Meinier

- Note: The match Trimbach–Wacker Grenchen was not played. It was awarded 0–3 forfeit to Wacker Grenchen.

Replay

Team 1	Score	Team 2
29 September 1946
Sion	0–2	FC Villeneuve

== Round 2 ==
The clubs from the 1946–47 1. Liga had been given a bye for the first round, these teams now joined the competition here, in the second round.

=== Summary ===
Team 1	Score	Team 2
20 October 1946
Le Locle-Sports	2–2 (a.e.t.)	FC Aurore Bienne
Sainte-Croix-Sports	0–1	Concordia Yverdon
Étoile-Sporting	4–1	FC Tramelan
CS La Tour-de-Peilz	2–1	Montreux-Sports
FC Sierre	5–2	FC Saint-Léonard
Vevey Sports	1–3	FC Villeneuve-Sports
Stade Lausanne	1–2	FC Ambrosiana Lausanne
FC Renens	3–1	Vignoble Cully
ES Malley	3–0	Racing Club Lausanne
Rhexia Campagnes Meinier	2–4	FC Gardy-Jonction (GE)
FC Le Sentier	4–3	Stade Nyonnais
Chiasso	4–2	US Giubiasco
GC Biasca	3–1	FC Oerlikon (ZH)
Luzerner SC	2–0	US Pro Daro
FC Horgen	2–0	Mendrisio
FC Widnau	6–2	Kreuzlingen
FC Amriswil	0–1	Arbon
FC Olten	2–1	FC Tössfeld
Frauenfeld	2–1	FC Altstetten (Zürich)
FC Stäfa (ZH)	1–0	Blue Stars
FC Lenzburg	3–2	FC Gränichen
Schöftland	4–0	FC Langnau am Albis
Zofingen	4–3	Baden
SC Derendingen	4–3 (a.e.t.) * Annulled	Minerva Bern
FC Victoria Bern	3–2 (a.e.t.)	Central Fribourg
Lengnau	3–1	FC Längasse (Bern)
Burgdorf	2–1 * awd 0–3	Moutier
FC Muhen	3–2	Solothurn
FC Porrentruy	4–4 (a.e.t.)	Wacker Grenchen
FC Allschwil	3–1	FC Birsfelden
Binningen	3–2	Concordia
Delémont	1–3	Black Stars
SC Kleinhüningen	1–2	FC Münchenstein
FC Neuhausen	3–4	FC Pratteln
FC Wil	0–1	Winterthur
Uster	2–0	FC Wetzikon

- Note: The match Burgdorf–Moutier, a player of Burgdorf was not a qualified player. The result was annulled and awarded awd 0–3 forfeit.
- Note: The match Derendingen–Minerva was annulled and replayed.

Replay

Team 1	Score	Team 2
3 November 1946
FC Aurore Bienne	0–0 (a.e.t.)	Le Locle-Sports
Wacker Grenchen	2–3	FC Porrentruy
10 November 1946
SC Derendingen	10–2	Minerva Bern

Second replay

Team 1	Score	Team 2
10 November 1946
Le Locle-Sports	3–0	FC Aurore Bienne

== Round 3 ==
The teams from this season's NLA and this season's NLB entered the cup competition in this round. However, the teams from the NLA were seeded and could not be drawn against each other. Whenever possible, the draw respected local regionalities. The third round was played on the week-end of 17 November.

=== Summary ===
Team 1	Score	Team 2
17 November 1946
La Chaux-de-Fonds	8–1	Villeneuve-Sports
Basel	3–2	Black Stars
FC Porrentruy	0–1	Nordstern
Urania Genève Sport	2–3	FC Ambrosiana Lausanne
FC Lenzburg	4–2	FC Helvetia Bern
FC Olten	4–2	Moutier
Red Star	2–1	Winterthur
Frauenfeld	3–5 (a.e.t.)	Grasshopper Club
Bern	2–1	FC Renens
Thun	5–1	FC Münchenstein
ES Malley	2–4 (a.e.t.)	Servette
FC Victoria Bern	0–2	FC Allschwil
Young Boys	2–0	FC Gardy-Jonction (GE)
Grenchen	10–1	FC Concordia Yverdon
Arbon	3–4	St. Gallen
Bellinzona	6–1	GC Biasca
Schöftland	4–4 (a.e.t.)	Lengnau
Biel-Bienne	4–0	FC Le Sentier
Young Fellows	4–0	Uster
FC Widnau	0–4	Zürich
Zofingen	0–5	Luzern
FC Horgen	2–1 (a.e.t.)	Brühl
CS La Tour-de-Peilz	0–8	Lausanne-Sport
Cantonal Neuchâtel	4–1	Le Locle-Sports
Chiasso	1–3 (a.e.t.)	Lugano
Schaffhausen	3–2	FC Pratteln
Aarau	3–0	SC Derendingen
SC Zug	3–0	FC Stäfa (ZH)
Fribourg	4–0	Étoile-Sporting
FC Sierre	1–2	CS International Genève
Luzerner SC	1–2	Locarno
FC Muhen	3–1	Binningen

Replay

Team 1	Score	Team 2
24 November 1946
Lengnau	0–2	Schöftland

=== Matches ===
17 November 1946

Basel	3–2	Black Stars Basel
Bader 5' (1:0); Suter 66' (2:0); Bader 75' (3:0)	FCB summary	76' (3:1) Horrisberger; 85' (3:2) Schmid

Landhof, Basel
Attendance: 3,000
Referee: (Switzerland) Ernst Jaggi (Bern)

17 November 1946

ES Malley	2–4 (a.e.t.)	Servette
Goal	Servette summary	2x Pasteur; 1x Belli; 1x Fatton

Centre sportif de la Tuilière, Malley

17 November 1946

FC Widnau	0–4	Zürich
	FCZ summary	5' (0:1) Kohler; 14' (0:2) Bosshard; 17' (0:3) Zanetti; 83' (0:4) Zanetti

Sportanlage Aegeten, Windnau
Attendance: 1,800
Referee: (Switzerland) Keller (Seuzach)

17 November 1946

Aarau	3–0	SC Derendingen
Goal	FCA summary

Stadion Brügglifeld, Aarau

== Round 4 ==
=== Summary ===
Team 1	Score	Team 2
8 December 1946
La Chaux-de-Fonds	1–2	Basel
Nordstern	4–0	FC Ambrosiana Lausanne
FC Lenzburg	0–3	FC Olten
Red Star	1–2	Grasshopper Club
Bern	7–1	Thun
Servette	7–0	FC Allschwil
Young Boys	1–3	Grenchen
St. Gallen	3–2 (a.e.t.)	Bellinzona
Schöftland	3–4	Biel-Bienne
Young Fellows	1–0	Zürich
Luzern	5–0	FC Horgen
Lausanne-Sport	6–0	Cantonal Neuchâtel
Lugano	2–1	Schaffhausen
Aarau	5–0	SC Zug
Fribourg	4–3	CS International Genève
Locarno	12–2	FC Muhen

=== Matches ===
8 December 1946
14:30

La Chaux-de-Fonds	1–2	Basel
Kernen 55' (1:1)	FCB summary	30' (0:1) Wenk; 70' (1:2) Oberer

Stade Charrière, La Chaux-de-Fonds
Attendance: 3,800
Referee: (Switzerland) Rodolphe Wittwer (Geneva)

8 December 1946

Servette	7–0	FC Allschwil
1x Roland Preu´hom; 1x Tamini; 4x Fatton; 1x Belli	Servette summary

Stade des Charmilles, Geneva

8 December 1946

Young Fellows	1–0	Zürich
Walter Fink 69' (1:0)	FCZ summary

Hardturm, Zürich
Attendance: 6,000
Referee: (Switzerland) Ernst Dörflinger (Grenchen)

8 December 1946

Aarau	5–0	SC Zug
Goal	FCA summary

Stadion Brügglifeld, Aarau

== Round 5 ==
=== Summary ===
Team 1	Score	Team 2
29 December 1946
Basel	6–1	Nordstern
FC Olten	0–3	Grasshopper Club
Bern	2–1	Servette
Grenchen	3–2	St. Gallen
Biel-Bienne	5–0	Young Fellows
Luzern	2–4 (a.e.t.)	Lausanne-Sport
Lugano	2–1	Aarau
Fribourg	1–1 (a.e.t.)	Locarno

Replay

Team 1	Score	Team 2
12 January 1947
Locarno	2–0	Fribourg

=== Matches ===
29 December 1946

Basel	6–1	Nordstern
Suter 15' (1:1); Grauer 32' (2:1); Stöcklin 34' (3:1); Vonthron 60' (4:1); Oberer 75' (5:1); Bader 88' (6:1)	FCB summary	2' (0:1) Hütter

Landhof, Basel
Attendance: 8,000
Referee: (Switzerland) A. Sandoz (Lausanne)

29 December 1946

Bern	2–1	Servette
Goal	Servette summary	Tamini

Stadion Neufeld, Bern

29 December 1946

Lugano	2–1	Aarau
Goal	FCA summary	Goal

Campo Marzio, Lugano

== Quarter-finals ==
=== Summary ===
Team 1	Score	Team 2
9 February 1947
Bern	0–2	Grenchen
Biel-Bienne	0–1	Lausanne-Sport
Basel	2–1	Grasshopper Club
Lugano	0–0 *	Locarno

- Note: The match Lugano–Locarno was abandoned after 90 minutes due to snow and therefore, replayed.

Replay

Team 1	Score	Team 2
23 February 1947
Lugano	1–1 *	Locarno

- Note: The match was abandoned at 100 minutes due to heavy rain and a water logged pitch. Therefore, replayed.

Second replay

Team 1	Score	Team 2
2 March 1947
Lugano	0–2	Locarno

=== Matches ===
9 February 1947
14:30

Basel	2–1	Grasshoppers
Wenk 62' (1:1); Grauer 80' (2:1)	FCB summary	60' (0:1) Amadò

Landhof, Basel
Attendance: 8,000
Referee: (Switzerland) Eugen Scherz (Bern)

== Semi-finals ==
=== Summary ===
Team 1	Score	Team 2
16 March 1947
Basel	2–1	Grenchen
Lausanne-Sport	3–3	Locarno

Replay

Team 1	Score	Team 2
30 March 1947
Locarno	2–2 *	Lausanne-Sport

- Note: the match was abandoned in the 103 minute due to bad weather and therefore, replayed.

Second replay

Team 1	Score	Team 2
5 April 1947
Lausanne-Sport	3–2	Locarno

=== Matches ===
16 March 1947
15:00

Basel	2–1	Grenchen
Oberer 32' (1:1); Bader 52' (2:1)	FCB summary	22' (0:1) Zadra

Stadion Rankhof, Basel
Attendance: 14,000
Referee: (Switzerland) Eugen Scherz (Bern)

16 March 1947

Lausanne-Sport	3–3 (a.e.t.)	Locarno
Monnard 20' (1:1); Guhl 24' (2:1); Monnard 54' (3:1)	Summary	12' (0:1) Ciseri; 85' (3:2) Ciseri; 87' (3:3) Losa

Pontaise, Lausanne

30 March 1947
Replay

Locarno	2–2 (a.e.t.)	Lausanne-Sport
Goal	Summary	Goal

Stadio Comunale, Bellinzona

5 April 1947
Second replay

Lausanne-Sport	3–2	Locarno
Bocquet 23' (pen.) (1:0); Aeby 50' (2:1); Eggimann 54' (3:1)	Summary	35' (pen.) (1:1)) Ciseri; 89' (3:2) Ciseri

Pontaise, Lausanne

== Final ==
The final was held in the capital Bern, at the Stadion Neufeld, on Easter Monday 1947.

=== Summary ===
Team 1	Score	Team 2
7 April 1947
Basel	3–0	Lausanne-Sport

=== Telegram ===
7 April 1947
15:00

Basel	3–0	Lausanne Sport
Stöcklin 48' (1:0); Bader 82' (2:0); Stöcklin 86' (3:0)	Fussball-Schweiz summary FCB summary

Stadion Neufeld, Bern
Attendance: 28,000
Referee: (Switzerland) Josef Schürch (Winterthur)

Basel won the cup and this was the club's second cup title to this date.

== Further in Swiss football ==
- 1946–47 Nationalliga A
- 1946–47 Nationalliga B
- 1946–47 Swiss 1. Liga

== Sources ==
- Fussball-Schweiz
- FCB Cup games 1946–47 at fcb-achiv.ch
- Switzerland 1946–47 at RSSSF

Preceded by 1945–46	Swiss Cup seasons	Succeeded by 1947–48
