= 1947–48 Swiss Cup =

Tournament details
- Country: Switzerland

Final positions
- Champions: La Chaux-de-Fonds
- Runners-up: Grenchen

The 1947–48 Swiss Cup was the 23d season of Switzerland's football cup competition, organised annually since the 1925–26 season by the Swiss Football Association.

== Overview ==
This season's cup competition began with the first round, which was played on the week-end of the 28 September 1947. The competition was to be completed on Easter Monday, 29 March 1948, with the final, which, since 1937, was traditionally held at the former Wankdorf Stadium in Bern. The clubs from the 1947–48 Swiss 1. Liga were given a bye for the first round, they joined the competition in the second round on the week-end of 12 October. The clubs from this season's Nationalliga A (NLA) and from this season's Nationalliga B (NLB) were given byes for the first two rounds. These teams joined the competition in the third round, which was played on the week-end of 26 October.

The matches were played in a knockout format. In the event of a draw after 90 minutes, the match went into extra time. In the event of a draw at the end of extra time, a replay was foreseen and this was played on the visiting team's pitch. If the replay ended in a draw after extra time, a toss of a coin would establish the team that qualified for the next round.

== Round 1 ==
In the first round, the lower league teams that had qualified themselves for the competition through their regional football association's regional cup competitions or their association's requirements, competed here. Whenever possible, the draw respected local regionalities. The games of the first round were played on Saturday 28 September 1947.

=== Summary ===
Team 1	Score	Team 2
28 September 1947
Mont-Cervin	1–4	CA Genève
Signal FC (Bernex)	1–2	Compesières FC (GE)
ES Malley	7–1	FC Gland
CS La Tour-de-Peilz	1–2	FC Aigle
FC Renens	5–2	Prilly-Sports
FC Stade Payerne	6–2	Grandson-Sports
Sion	1–4	Monthey
FC Ardon	3–5	FC Saint-Léonard
FC Auvernier	1–0	FC Fleurier
FC Bévilard	3–2	FC Floria
FC Tavannes	4–1	FC Tramelan
FC Längasse (Bern)	1–3	FC Viktoria Bern
FC Kirchberg	3–0	FC Belp
Zähringia Bern	1–0	SV Lyss
FC Nidau	0–7	FC Bözingen 34
FC Gerlafingen	2–1	Burgdorf
Wacker Grenchen	5–2	Minerva Bern
FC Gränichen	2–1	FC Menziken
FC Turgi	4–1	FC Suhr
Emmenbrücke	3–2	US Giubiasco
FC Thalwil	2–5	FC Stäfa (ZH)
FC Dietikon	2–0	Diana
FC Unterstrass	0–2	FC Adliswil
FC Horgen	2–1	FC Oerlikon
FC Phönix Seen (Winterthur)	5–2	FC Bülach
FC Töss	0–2	FC Tössfeld
FC Glarus	1–2	FC Lachen
Chur	0–2	FC Widnau
Gossau	4–1	FC Bischofszell
Frauenfeld	2–1	FC Amriswil
Spvgg Schaffhausen	1–0	Old Boys
FC Trimbach	3–1	FC Klus
FC Allschwil	7–1	Laufen
Dornach	1–2	FC Breitenbach
SC Balerna	3–1	US Pro Daro
5 October 1947
Saint-Imier-Sports	6–2	FC Couvet

== Round 2 ==
The clubs from the 1947–48 1. Liga had been given a bye for the first round, these teams now joined the competition here, in the second round.

=== Summary ===
Team 1	Score	Team 2
12 October 1947
Arbon	2–1 (a.e.t.)	Frauenfeld
Gossau	0–1	FC Altstetten (Zürich)
FC Horgen	2–0	Zofingen
FC Lachen	2–0	Blue Stars
FC Phönix Seen (Winterthur)	4–1 (a.e.t.)	Red Star
Emmenbrücke	4–3	Schöftland
FC Stäfa (ZH)	1–2	Biasca
FC Trimbach	0–3	SV Höngg
FC Turgi	3–5	FC Pratteln
Uster	3–2 (a.e.t.)	FC Tössfeld
FC Widnau	2–1	Kreuzlingen
Winterthur	3–0	FC Adliswil
SC Balerna	2–1	Mendrisio
FC Allschwil	1–1 (a.e.t.)	Black Stars
FC Birsfelden	5–1	Spvgg Schaffhausen
FC Bözingen 34	1–2	FC Porrentruy
Delémont	4–2 (a.e.t.)	FC Breitenbach
FC Gerlafingen	1–3	SC Derendingen
FC Gränichen	2–1 (a.e.t.)	FC Olten
FC Kirchberg	2–0	FC Helvetia Bern
SC Kleinhüningen	8–0	FC Dietikon
Solothurn	5–3	Wacker Grenchen
Zähringia Bern	1–3	Lengnau
ES Malley	0–2	FC Ambrosiana Lausanne
Vevey Sports	4–2	FC Saint-Léonard
FC Renens	1–0	Racing Club Lausanne
Stade Nyonnais	4–2	Compesières FC (GE)
Le Locle-Sports	5–3	Saint-Imier-Sports
FC Concordia Yverdon	6–1	FC Stade Payerne
Moutier	3–3 (a.e.t.)	FC Tavannes
FC Aigle	3–4 (a.e.t.)	Stade Lausanne
FC Auvernier	1–3	Montreux-Sports
FC Bévilard	2–5	Étoile-Sporting
CA Genève	0–3	FC Gardy-Jonction (GE)
Central Fribourg	5–1	FC Viktoria Bern
Monthey	6–1	FC Sierre

Replays

Team 1	Score	Team 2
19 October 1947
Black Stars	4–2 (a.e.t.)	FC Allschwil
FC Tavannes	3–2	Moutier

== Round 3 ==
The teams from this season's NLA and this season's NLB entered the cup competition in this round. However, the teams from the NLA were seeded and could not be drawn against each other. Whenever possible, the draw respected local regionalities. The third round was played on the week-end of 26 October.

=== Summary ===
Team 1	Score	Team 2
26 October 1947
Bern	4–0	Black Stars
Servette	4–2	Vevey Sports
FC Birsfelden	2–1	Brühl
Solothurn	2–4	Nordstern
FC Pratteln	2–3	St. Gallen
Aarau	3–0	Delémont
Lugano	9–3	Lengnau
FC Horgen	0–1	FC Lachen
Cantonal Neuchâtel	3–2 (a.e.t.)	FC Ambrosiana Lausanne
Biel-Bienne	3–1	Stade Nyonnais
Le Locle-Sports	1–6	La Chaux-de-Fonds
CS International Genève	1–0 (a.e.t.)	Monthey
Basel	7–0	SC Balerna
Zürich	6–0	Uster
Luzern	0–1 (a.e.t.)	SC Kleinhüningen
Locarno	7–1	FC Widnau
Concordia	0–2	SC Derendingen
Chiasso	3–1	Biasca
Bellinzona	3–0	SV Höngg
Emmenbrücke	2–8	Young Boys
Arbon	2–1	Schaffhausen
FC Altstetten (Zürich)	1–1 (a.e.t.)	Young Fellows
Lausanne-Sport	10–2	FC Concordia Yverdon
Thun	2–0	FC Porrentruy
FC Gardy-Jonction (GE)	2–0	FC Renens
Central Fribourg	5–1	FC Gränichen
SC Zug	2–0	Winterthur
FC Phönix Seen (Winterthur)	2–3	Grasshopper Club
Urania Genève Sport	4–0	Stade Lausanne
Étoile-Sporting	1–3	Montreux-Sports
Fribourg	6–1	FC Kirchberg
Grenchen	18–0	FC Tavannes

Replay

Team 1	Score	Team 2
2 November 1947
Young Fellows	6–0	FC Altstetten (Zürich)

=== Matches ===
26 October 1947

Servette	4–2	Vevey Sports
1x Fatton; 2x Facchinetti; 1x Tamini	Servette summary	Goal

Stade des Charmilles, Geneva

26 October 1947

Aarau	3–0	Delémont
Goal	FCA summary

Stadion Brügglifeld, Aarau

26 October 1947

Basel	7–0	SC Balerna
3x Oberer; 2x Suter; 2x Stäuble	FCB summary

Landhof, Basel
Attendance: 2,500
Referee: (Switzerland) Schmidsberger (Zürich)

26 October 1947

Zürich	6–0	Uster
Cornioley 3' (1:0); Zanetti 30' (2:0); Walter 32' (3:0); Cornioley 55' (4:0); Cornioley 83' (5:0); Schneiter 85' (6:0)	FCZ summary

Letzigrund, Zürich

26 October 1947

Grenchen	18–0	FC Tavannes
4x Perroud; 7x Courtat; 1x Tschui; 4x Heinz Pfister; 4x Righetti II; 1x Monbaron	Summary

== Round 4 ==
=== Summary ===
Team 1	Score	Team 2
7 December 1947
Bern	1–2	Servette
FC Birsfelden	2–2 (a.e.t.); Abandoned	Nordstern
St. Gallen	4–0	Aarau
Lugano	2–1	FC Lachen
Cantonal Neuchâtel	0–5	Biel-Bienne
La Chaux-de-Fonds	3–0	CS International Genève
Basel	2–1	Zürich
SC Kleinhüningen	3–6	Locarno
SC Derendingen	3–6 (a.e.t.)	Chiasso
Bellinzona	3–1	Young Boys
Arbon	1–5	Young Fellows
Lausanne-Sport	9–0	Thun
FC Gardy-Jonction (GE)	1–1 (a.e.t.)	Central Fribourg
SC Zug	0–7	Grasshopper Club
Grenchen	4–3	Urania Genève Sport
Montreux-Sports	2–1	Fribourg

Replays

Team 1	Score	Team 2
14 December 1947
FC Birsfelden	2–4	Nordstern
21 December 1947
Central Fribourg	3–1	FC Gardy-Jonction (GE)

=== Matches ===
7 December 1947

Bern	1–2	Servette
Goal	Servette summary	Buchoux; Facchinetti

Stadion Neufeld, Bern

7 December 1947

St. Gallen	4–0	Aarau
Goal	FCA summary

Espenmoos, St. Gallen

7 December 1947
14:30

Basel	2–1	Zürich
Oberer 12' (1:0); Bader 58' (2:0)	FCB summary FCZ summary	62' (2:1) Zanetti; (penalty missed) 67′ Bosshard

Landhof, Basel
Attendance: 4,300
Referee: (Switzerland) Niederhauser (Bern)

== Round 5 ==
=== Summary ===
Team 1	Score	Team 2
28 December 1947
Nordstern	2–2 (a.e.t.)	Servette
St. Gallen	0–0 (a.e.t.)	Lugano
Biel-Bienne	0–1	La Chaux-de-Fonds
Basel	5–3	Locarno
Chiasso	1–2	Bellinzona
Young Fellows	2–4	Lausanne-Sport
Central Fribourg	2–7	Grasshopper Club
Grenchen	3–1	Montreux-Sports

Replays

Team 1	Score	Team 2
4 January 1948
Servette	Abandoned due to fog	Nordstern
Lugano	2–1	St. Gallen

Second replay

Team 1	Score	Team 2
11 January 1948
Servette	3–0	Nordstern

=== Matches ===
28 December 1947

Nordstern	2–2 (a.e.t.)	Servette
Goal	Servette summary	Mouthon; Tamini

Rankhof, Basel

11 January 1948

Servette	3–0	Nordstern
Fatton (1:0); Buchoux (2:0); Tamini (3:0)	Servette summary

Stade des Charmilles, Geneva

27 December 1947

Basel	5–3	Locarno
Bader 30' (1:0); Oberer 35' (2:0); Wenk 40' (3:0); Oberer 44' (4:0); Hägler 65' (5:0)	FCB summary	(red card) 60' Visentin; 69' (pen. 5:1) Ernst; 78' (5:2) Ernst; 88' (5:3) Losa

Landhof, Basel
Attendance: 4,000
Referee: (Switzerland) A. Sandoz (Lausanne)

== Quarter-finals ==
=== Summary ===
Team 1	Score	Team 2
11 January 1948
La Chaux-de-Fonds	2–0	Basel
Lugano	1–2	Bellinzona
Lausanne-Sport	1–2	Grasshopper Club
1 February 1948
Servette	4–5	Grenchen

=== Matches ===
11 January 1948
14:30

La Chaux-de-Fonds	2–0	Basel
Amey 37' (1:0); Hermann 38' (2:0)	FCB summary

Stade Charrière, La Chaux-de-Fonds
Attendance: 7,500
Referee: (Switzerland) DörflingerGrenchen

1 February 1948

Servette	4–5	Grenchen
Pierre Stefano; Fatton (o.g.); André Belli	Servette summary	Goal

Stade des Charmilles, Geneva

== Semi-finals ==
=== Summary ===
Team 1	Score	Team 2
7 March 1948
La Chaux-de-Fonds	1–0	Bellinzona
Grasshopper Club	0–3	Grenchen

7 March 1948

La Chaux-de-Fonds	1–0	Bellinzona
Antenen 74' (1:0)	Summary

Centre Sportif de la Charrière, La Chaux-de-Fonds

7 March 1948

Grasshopper Club	0–3	Grenchen
	Summary	53' (0:1) Courtat; 70' (0:2) Righetti I 81' (0:3) Righetti I

Hardturm, Zürich

== Final ==
The final was held at the former Wankdorf Stadium in Bern on Easter Monday 1948. Because the game ended with a draw after extra time a replay was required and played three weeks later at the same venue. Because the replay also ended with a draw after extra time a second replay was required and this was played after the end of the league season at the Pontaise in Lausanne.

=== Summary ===
Team 1	Score	Team 2
29 March 1948
La Chaux-de-Fonds	2–2 (a.e.t.)	Grenchen

Replay

Team 1	Score	Team 2
18 April 1948
La Chaux-de-Fonds	2–2 (a.e.t.)	Grenchen

Second replay

Team 1	Score	Team 2
27 June 1948
La Chaux-de-Fonds	4–0	Grenchen

=== Telegram ===
29 March 1948
15:00

La Chaux-de-Fonds	2–2 (a.e.t.)	Grenchen
Amey 46' (1:0); Amey 62' (2:1)	Fussball-Schweiz summary	52' (1:1) Courtat; 70' (2:2) Bohren

Wankdorf Stadium, Bern
Attendance: 32,000
Referee: (Switzerland) Ernst Ruefer (Bern)

18 April 1948
15:00

La Chaux-de-Fonds	2–2 (a.e.t.)	Grenchen
Amey 65' (1:1); Busenhart 67' (2:1)	Fussball-Schweiz summary	44' (0:1) Courtat; 78' (2:2) Righetti I

Wankdorf Stadium, Bern
Attendance: 18:00

27 June 1948
15:00

La Chaux-de-Fonds	4–0	Grenchen
Antenen 20' (1:0); Kernen 73' (2:0); Kernen 78' (3:0); Antenen 79' (4:0)	Fussball-Schweiz summary

Pontaise, Lausanne
Attendance: 12,000
Referee: (Switzerland) Ernst Ruefer (Bern)

La Chaux-de-Fonds won the cup and this was the club's first cup title to this date.

== Further in Swiss football ==
- 1947–48 Nationalliga A
- 1947–48 Nationalliga B
- 1947–48 Swiss 1. Liga

== Sources ==
- Fussball-Schweiz
- FCB Cup games 1947–48 at fcb-achiv.ch
- Switzerland 1947–48 at RSSSF

Preceded by 1946–47	Swiss Cup seasons	Succeeded by 1948–49
