= 1945–46 Swiss Cup =

Tournament details
- Country: Switzerland

Final positions
- Champions: Grasshopper Club
- Runners-up: Lausanne-Sport

The 1945–46 Swiss Cup was the 21st season of Switzerland's football cup competition, organised annually since the 1925–26 season by the Swiss Football Association.

== Overview ==
This season's cup competition began with the first round, which was played on the week-end of the 30 September 1945. The competition was to be completed on Easter Monday, 22 April 1946, with the final, which, since 1937, was traditionally held in the country's capital, at the former Wankdorf Stadium in Bern. The lower league teams that had qualified themselves for the competition and the clubs from the 1945–46 Swiss 1. Liga joined the competition in the first round. The clubs from this season's Nationalliga A (NLA) and from this season's Nationalliga B (NLB) were given byes for the first two rounds. These teams joined the competition in the third round, which was played on the week-end of 5 November.

The matches were played in a knockout format. In the event of a draw after 90 minutes, the match went into extra time. In the event of a draw at the end of extra time, a replay was foreseen and this was played on the visiting team's pitch. If the replay ended in a draw after extra time, a toss of a coin would establish the team that qualified for the next round.

== Round 1 ==
In the first round, the lower league teams that had qualified themselves for the competition through their regional football association's own regional cup competitions or had achieved their association's requirements, competed here together with all of the teams from this years 1. Liga. Whenever possible, the draw respected local regionalities. The games of the first round were played on Saturday 30 September.

=== Summary ===
==== Region Ostschweiz ====
Team 1	Score	Team 2
30 September 1945
Kreuzlingen	2–0	FC Neuhausen
FC Wil	6–0	Frauenfeld
FC Weinfelden	2–4	FC Amriswil
Arbon	1–0	FC St. Margarethen
FC Rheineck	0–6	FC Widnau
FC Uzwil	0–3	FC Fortuna (SG)

==== Region Zürich ====
Team 1	Score	Team 2
30 September 1945
FC Rüti (ZH)	0–1	FC Lachen
Chur	4–1	FC Glarus
FC Töss (Winterthur)	3–1	FC Phönix (Winterthur)
Winterthur	2–1	FC Tössfeld (Winterthur)
FC Adliswil	3–2	Polizei Zürich
FC Bülach	4–1	FC Unterstrass (ZH)
SV Höngg	2–0	FC Wiedikon
FC Horgen	7–1	FC Stäfa (ZH)
Uster	3–1	FC Wetzikon
AS Ticinese	0–2	SV Seebach
FC Oerlikon	4–1	FC Altstetten (Zürich)
Blue Stars	9–0	FC Schlieren (ZH)

==== Region Innerschweiz ====
Team 1	Score	Team 2
30 September 1945
FC Altdorf (Uri)	9–1	FC Zug
Emmenbrücke	1–7 (a.e.t.)	Luzerner SC

==== Region Aargau ====
Team 1	Score	Team 2
30 September 1945
Baden	0–0 (a.e.t.)	Red Star
FC Erlinsbach	1–2	FC Rohr
FC Brugg	1–0	Wettingen
FC Olten	4–0	SV Sissach
Zofingen	2–3	FC Schönenwerd
Schöftland	2–1	Sporting Aarau
FC Gränichen	4–2	FC Kulm
7 October 1945
Wohlen	5–1	FC Dietikon

Replay

Team 1	Score	Team 2
14 October 1945
Red Star	0–1	Baden

==== Region Nordwestschweiz ====
Team 1	Score	Team 2
30 September 1945
Old Boys	2–0	FC Breitenbach
FC Allschwil	1–2	Black Stars
FC Birsfelden	3–1	Binningen
FC Liestal	0–1	FC Pratteln
Laufen	2–3	FC Porrentruy
SC Kleinhüningen	4–0	FC Riehen
Muttenz	2–3	Concordia

==== Region Zentralschweiz ====
Team 1	Score	Team 2
30 September 1945
FC Klus-Balsthal	2–3	FC Bözingen 34
FC Gerlafingen	2–4	Solothurn
FC Langenthal	5–3	FC Subingen
FC Langnau im Emmental	2–3	Kickers Luzern
FC Interlaken	1–3	Thun
Central Fribourg	4–3	Minerva Bern
FC Längasse (Bern)	0–4	FC Victoria Bern
FC Belp	0–2 (a.e.t.)	Zähringia Bern
Burgdorf	3–1	FC Biberist
Lengnau	4–1	FC Aurore Bienne
FC Nidau	1–3	FC Madretsch (Biel)
FC Mett	2–3	FC Reconvilier
Moutier	2–1	US Bienne-Boujean

==== Region Romande ====
Team 1	Score	Team 2
30 September 1945
Carouge Stade	2–0	Chênois
US Campagnes Meinier	4–2	Stade Français (GE)
Amical Abattoirs (GE)	0–3	FC Gardy-Jonction (GE)
Stade Lausanne	3–3 (a.e.t.)	FC Forward Morges
CS La Tour-de-Peilz	0–1	Racing Club Lausanne
Villeneuve Sports	1–2	Bex
FC Aigle	3–1	FC Saint-Maurice
ES Malley	1–0	FC Ambrosiana Lausanne
FC Renens	5–2	FC Lucens
Vevey Sports	5–0	FC Broc
Bulle	1–2 (a.e.t.)	Montreux-Sports
FC Saint-Léonard	2–3	FC Sierre
FC Chippis	3–2	FC Grône
Monthey	6–1	Sion
FC Le Sentier	8–0	FC Cossonay
FC Grandson	0–3	Concordia Yverdon
FC Tavannes	1–2	FC Tramelan
Le Locle-Sports	1–0	SEP Saint-Imier
FC Fleurier	3–4	FC Fontainemelon
FC Colombier	1–1 (a.e.t.)	Couvet-Sports

Replays

Team 1	Score	Team 2
21 October 1945
FC Forward Morges	1–3	Stade Lausanne
28 October 1945
Couvet-Sports (t)	1–1 (a.e.t.) *	FC Colombier

- Note: (t): Couvet-Sports qualified on toss of a coin.

==== Region Ticino ====
Team 1	Score	Team 2
30 September 1945
SC Balerna	3–2	Chiasso
FC Agno	2–3	Mendrisio
GC Biasca	1–0	US Pro Daro
US Giubiasco	7–0	Bodio

== Round 2 ==
=== Summary ===
Team 1	Score	Team 2
11 November 1945
Mendrisio	1–1 (a.e.t.)	Chiasso
FC Porrentruy	1–2	FC Birsfelden
Racing Club Lausanne	0–6	Vevey Sports
FC Pratteln	2–4 (a.e.t.)	FC Olten
Baden	1–3	Blue Stars
FC Amriswil	2–1	Arbon
FC Lachen	3–2	Uster
FC Adliswil	4–3	SV Höngg
FC Schönenwerd	1–5	Schöftland
Solothurn	3–2	FC Madretsch (Biel)
Central Fribourg	3–2	FC Victoria Bern
Zähringia Bern	0–6	Thun
Black Stars	2–1	SC Kleinhünungen
Concordia	1–0	Old Boys
FC Reconvilier	0–8	Moutier
FC Sierre	4–0	FC Chippis
Martigny-Sports	4–0	FC Aigle
FC Renens	2–8	ES Malley
FC Gardy-Jonction (GE)	1–2	Stade Lausanne
FC Bülach	2–3	Winterthur
FC Rohr	1–3	FC Gränichen
Concordia Yverdon	5–1 (a.e.t.)	FC Le Sentier
FC Wil	1–10	FC Töss
Kickers Luzern	0–4	FC Altdorf (Uri)
FC Brugg	1–5	Wohlen
FC Widnau	0–0 abd	Chur
FC Bözingen 34	0–4	Lengnau
GC Biasca	3–0	US Giubiasco
FC Fontainemelon	6–0	Couvet-Sports
Bex	1–3	Monthey
US Champagnes Meinier	3–1	Stade Carouge
18 November 1945
FC Tramelan	2–1	Le Locle-Sports
FC Fortuna (SG)	3–4	Kreuzlingen
SV Seebach	0–1	FC Oerlikon
FC Langenthal	1–4	Burgdorf
FC Horgen	2–3	Luzerner SC

Replays

Team 1	Score	Team 2
18 November 1945
Chiasso	0–0 (a.e.t.)	Mendrisio (t)
FC Widnau	4–0	Chur

- Note: (t): Mendrisio qualified on toss of a coin.

== Round 3 ==
The teams from this season's NLA and this season's NLB entered the cup competition in this round. However, the teams from the NLA were seeded and could not be drawn against each other. Whenever possible, the draw respected local regionalities. The third round was played on the week-end of 25 November.

=== Summary ===
Team 1	Score	Team 2
25 November 1945
FC Tramelan	0–4	Biel-Bienne
La Chaux-de-Fonds	3–0	Moutier
Thun	1–2 (a.e.t.)	Young Boys
Mendrisio	0–2	Locarno
Wohlen	2–3	Bern
Young Fellows	4–1	Kreuzlingen
Bellinzona	4–1	FC Oerlikon
FC Amriswil	0–4	Zürich
Lugano	5–1	GC Biasca
Grasshopper Club	5–0	Luzerner SC
Concordia Yverdon	2–1	Étoile-Sporting
Concordia Basel	5–0	FC Helvetia Bern
Nordstern	4–1	FC Olten
Schöftland	1–5	Basel
Winterthur	3–5	St. Gallen
FC Adliswil	2–4	Luzern
Fribourg	4–2	Montreux-Sports
Aarau	4–0	Burgdorf
Lengnau	3–1	SC Derendingen
Schaffhausen	2–1	FC Lachen
Brühl	2–1	FC Altdorf (Uri)
SC Zug	3–1	FC Töss (Winterthur)
Solothurn	4–1 (a.e.t.)	FC Birsfelden
FC Gränichen	5–3	Black Stars
FC Widnau	2–3	Blue Stars
Stade Lausanne	5–1	US Champagnes Meinier
30 December 1945
Central Fribourg	1–7	Grenchen
Monthey	2–7	Servette
Lausanne-Sport	9–0	ES Malley
Cantonal Neuchâtel	6–2	FC Fontainemelon
Urania Genève Sport	12–0	FC Sierre
CS International Genève	3–4	Vevey Sports

=== Matches ===
25 November 1945

FC Amriswil	0–4	Zürich
	FCZ summary	3' (0:1) Walter; 20' (0:2) Haug; 44' (0:3) Haug; 50' (0:4) Haug

Tellenfeld, Amriswil
Attendance: 1,200
Referee: (Switzerland) Imhof (St. Gallen)

25 November 1945

Schöftland	1–5	Basel
Lüthy 7' (1:0)	FCB summary	12' (1:1) Suter; 40' (o.g. 1:2); 44' (1:3) Bertsch (1:4) Bader (pen.) (1:5) Bader

Gemeindesportplatz, Schöftland
Attendance: 900
Referee: (Switzerland) Schmidsberger (Zürich)

25 November 1945

Aarau	4–0	Burgdorf
Goal	FCA summary

Stadion Brügglifeld, Aarau

30 December 1945

Monthey	2–7	Servette
Goal	Servette summary	2x Belli; 2x Pasteur; 2x Tamini; 1x Facchinetti

Stade Philippe Pottier, Monthey

== Round 4 ==
=== Summary ===
Team 1	Score	Team 2
30 December 1945
Grasshopper Club	5–2	Concordia
St. Gallen	5–1	Brühl
Lugano	1–0 (a.e.t.)	Zürich
Nordstern	1–1 (a.e.t.)	Young Fellows
Bellinzona	0–2	Locarno
FC Gränichen	1–1 (a.e.t.)	SC Zug
Bern	3–0	Stade Lausanne
Schaffhausen	2–0	Blue Stars
Biel-Bienne	5–0	La Chaux-de-Fonds
6 January 1946
Cantonal Neuchâtel	0–2	Grenchen
Lausanne-Sport	6–1	FC Concordia Yverdon
Urania Genève Sport	3–1	Lengnau
Aarau	1–0 (a.e.t.)	Luzern
Solothurn	1–2	Young Boys
13 January 1946
Servette	9–0	Vevey Sports
Fribourg	0–4	Basel

Replays

Team 1	Score	Team 2
6 January 1946
SC Zug	2–1	FC Gränichen
13 January 1946
Young Fellows	3–1	Nordstern

=== Matches ===
30 December 1945

Lugano	1–0 (a.e.t.)	Zürich
Roberto Bergamini 102' (1:0)	FCZ summary

Campo Marzio, Lugano
Attendance: 3,500
Referee: (Switzerland) Paul von Wartburg (Bern)

6 January 1946

Aarau	1–0 (a.e.t.)	Luzern
(1:0)	FCA summary

Stadion Brügglifeld, Aarau

13 January 1946

Servette	9–0	Vevey Sports
2x Facchinetti; 1x Buchoux; 3x Belli; 2x Fatton; 1x Tamini	Servette summary

Stade des Charmilles, Geneva

13 January 1946

Fribourg	0–4	Basel
Thomet (penalty missed) 69′	FCB summary	75' (0:1) Oberer; 80' (0:2) Wenk; 84' (0:3) Wenk; 86' (0:4) Bader

Stade Universitaire, Freiburg
Attendance: 2,500
Referee: (Switzerland) Eugen Scherz (Bern)

== Round 5 ==
=== Summary ===
Team 1	Score	Team 2
13 January 1946
Schaffhausen	0–2	Biel-Bienne
Grenchen	2–0	Locarno
20 January 1946
Lausanne-Sport	2–0	Urania Genève Sport
SC Zug	1–3	Bern
Young Fellows	1–1 (a.e.t.)	Locarno
3 February 1946
Basel	3–4	Servette
10 February 1946
Grasshopper Club	7–2	St. Gallen
Young Boys	5–1	Aarau

Replay

Team 1	Score	Team 2
17 February 1946
Locarno	2–1	Young Fellows

=== Matches ===
3 February 1946
14:30

Basel	3–4	Servette
Bertsch 12' (1:0); Suter 27' (2:0); Bader 29' (3:0)	FCB summary	50' (3:1) Fatton; 62' (3:2) Tamini; 66' (3:3) Facchinetti; 90' (3:4) Tamini

Landhof, Basel
Attendance: 7,000
Referee: (Switzerland) Ernst Dörflinger (Grenchen)

10 February 1946

Young Boys	5–1	Aarau
Goal	FCA summary	Goal

Wankdorf Stadium, Bern

== Quarter-finals ==
=== Summary ===
Team 1	Score	Team 2
17 March 1946
Grasshopper Club	2–1	Grenchen
Bern	0–0 (a.e.t.)	Lausanne-Sport
Locarno	0–2	Young Boys
Biel-Bienne	1–2	Servette

Replay

Team 1	Score	Team 2
24 March 1946
Lausanne-Sport	4–1 (a.e.t.)	Bern

=== Matches ===
17 March 1946

Biel-Bienne	1–2	Servette
Goal	Servette summary	2x Fatton

Stadion Gurzelen, Biel/Bienne

== Semi-finals ==
=== Summary ===
Team 1	Score	Team 2
7 April 1946
Young Boys	0–2	Grasshopper Club
Servette	1–1 (a.e.t.)	Lausanne-Sport

Replay

Team 1	Score	Team 2
14 April 1946
Lausanne-Sport	3–2	Servette

=== Matches ===
7 April 1946

Young Boys	0–2	Grasshopper Club
	summary	11' (0:1) Bickel; 77' (0:2) Amadò

Wankdorf Stadium, Bern

7 April 1946

Servette	1–1	Lausanne-Sport
Facchinetti 52' (1:0)	summary	56' (1:1) Aeby

Stade des Charmilles, Geneva

14 April 1946
Replay

Lausanne-Sport	3–2 (a.e.t.)	Servette
Aeby 66' (2:1); Maillard II 70' (2:2); Eggimann 114' (3:2)	summary	47' (0:1) Facchinetti; 62' (0:2) Pasteur

Pontaise, Lausanne

== Final ==
The final was held in the capital Bern, at the former Wankdorf Stadium, on Easter Monday 1946.

=== Summary ===
Team 1	Score	Team 2
22 April 1946
Grasshopper Club	3–0	Lausanne-Sport

=== Telegram ===
22 April 1946
15:00

Grasshopper Club	3–0	Lausanne-Sport
Neukom 11' (1:0); Friedländer 77' (2:0); Friedländer 79' (pen.) (3:0)	Fussball-Schweiz summary

Wankdorf Stadium, Bern
Attendance: 20,000
Referee: (Switzerland) Vogt (Basel)

Grasshopper Club won the cup and this was the club's eleventh cup title to this date.

== Further in Swiss football ==
- 1945–46 Nationalliga A
- 1945–46 Nationalliga B
- 1945–46 Swiss 1. Liga

== Sources ==
- Fussball-Schweiz
- FCB Cup games 1945–46 at fcb-achiv.ch
- Switzerland 1945–46 at RSSSF

Preceded by 1944–45	Swiss Cup seasons	Succeeded by 1946–47
