= 1946–47 Swiss 1. Liga =

1. Liga
- Season: 1946–47
- Champions: 1. Liga champions: Chiasso; Group West: Vevey-Sports; Group Cenral: Concordia; Group South and East: Chiasso
- Promoted: Chiasso; Concordia
- Relegated: Group West: FC Renens; Group Central: FC Gränichen; Group South and East: US Pro Daro
- Matches: 3 times 132 and 1 decider plus 3 play-offs

The 1946–47 1. Liga season was the 15th season of the 1. Liga since its creation in 1931. At this time, the 1. Liga was the third-tier of the Swiss football league system.

== Format ==
There were 36 teams competing in the 1. Liga this season. They were divided into three regional groups, each group with 12 teams. Within each group, the teams would play a double round-robin to decide their league position. Two points were awarded for a win and one point was awarded for a draw. The three group winners then contested a play-off round to decide the two promotion slots to the second-tier (NLB). The last placed team in each group were directly relegated to the 2. Liga (fourth tier).

== Group West ==
=== Teams, locations ===
Club	Based in	Canton	Stadium	Capacity
FC Central Fribourg	Fribourg	Fribourg	Guintzet	2,000
FC Étoile-Sporting	La Chaux-de-Fonds	Neuchâtel	Les Foulets / Terrain des Eplatures	1,000 / 500
FC Gardy-Jonction	Geneva	Geneva		
FC Le Locle	Le Locle	Neuchâtel	Installation sportive - Jeanneret	3,142
FC Montreux-Sports	Montreux	Vaud	Stade de Chailly	1,000
Racing Club Lausanne	Lausanne	Vaud	Centre sportif de la Tuilière	1,000
FC Renens	Renens	Vaud	Zone sportive du Censuy	2,300
FC Sierre	Sierre	Valais	Complexe Ecossia	2,000
FC Stade Lausanne	Ouchy, Lausanne	Vaud	Centre sportif de Vidy	1,000
FC Stade Nyonnais	Nyon	Vaud	Stade de Colovray	7,200
Vevey-Sports	Vevey	Vaud	Stade de Copet	4,000
Concordia Yverdon	Yverdon-les-Bains	Vaud	Stade Municipal	6,600

=== Final league table ===
Pos	Team	Pld	W	D	L	GF	GA	GD	BP	Pts	Qualification or relegation
1	Vevey-Sports	22	13	7	2	46	23	+23	0	33	To promotion play-off
2	FC Stade Lausanne	22	12	6	4	53	27	+26	0	30	
3	FC Montreux-Sports	22	10	7	5	45	37	+8	0	27	
4	FC Sierre	22	10	3	9	65	49	+16	0	23	
5	Concordia Yverdon	22	9	5	8	35	37	−2	0	23	
6	Central Fribourg	22	6	8	8	33	32	+1	−1	19	
7	FC Stade Nyonnais	22	6	7	9	41	52	−11	0	19	
8	FC Le Locle	22	6	7	9	34	47	−13	0	19	
9	FC Gardy-Jonction	22	8	3	11	33	52	−19	0	19	
10	FC Étoile-Sporting	22	7	5	10	43	51	−8	−1	18	
11	Racing Club Lausanne	22	6	5	11	37	45	−8	0	17	
12	FC Renens	22	3	9	10	32	45	−13	0	15	Relegation to 2. Liga

Source: RSSSF
Rules for classification: 1) Points; 2) Goal difference within the league, but decider play-off for qualifiers.

Note BP: The game Central Fribourg against Étoile-Sporting was abandoned and was rated as 0–0 without points.

== Group Central ==
=== Teams, locations ===
Club	Based in	Canton	Stadium	Capacity
FC Birsfelden	Birsfelden	Basel-Landschaft	Sternenfeld	9,400
FC Black Stars Basel	Basel	Basel-Stadt	Buschwilerhof	1,200
FC Concordia Basel	Basel	Basel-Stadt	Stadion Rankhof	7,000
SC Derendingen	Derendingen	Solothurn	Heidenegg	1,500
FC Gränichen	Gränichen	Aargau	ZehnderMatte	1,000
SC Kleinhüningen	Basel	Basel-Stadt	Sportplatz Schorenmatte	300
FC Lengnau	Lengnau	Bern	Moos Lengnau BE	3,900
FC Moutier	Moutier	Bern	Stade de Chalière	5,000
FC Porrentruy	Porrentruy	Jura	Stade du Tirage	4,226
FC Pratteln	Pratteln	Basel-Landschaft	In den Sandgruben	5,000
SC Schöftland	Schöftland	Aargau	Sportanlage Rütimatten	2,000
FC Solothurn	Solothurn	Solothurn	Stadion FC Solothurn	6,750

=== Final league table ===
Pos	Team	Pld	W	D	L	GF	GA	GD	Pts	Qualification or relegation
1	FC Concordia Basel	22	13	4	5	65	31	+34	30	To promotion play-off
2	FC Moutier	22	10	7	5	53	42	+11	27	
3	SC Derendingen	22	11	4	7	52	31	+21	26	
4	SC Kleinhüningen	22	12	2	8	41	36	+5	26	
5	FC Birsfelden	22	9	5	8	36	32	+4	23	
6	FC Pratteln	22	10	3	9	57	55	+2	23	
7	FC Black Stars Basel	22	8	6	8	53	43	+10	22	
8	FC Lengnau	22	7	6	9	28	27	+1	20	
9	SC Schöftland	22	8	4	10	51	51	0	20	
10	FC Porrentruy	22	8	4	10	39	52	−13	20	
11	FC Solothurn	22	7	6	9	29	39	−10	20	
12	FC Gränichen	22	1	5	16	26	91	−65	7	Relegation to 2. Liga

Source: RSSSF
Rules for classification: 1) Points; 2) Goal difference within the league, but decider play-off for qualifiers.

== Group South and East ==
=== Teams, locations ===
Club	Based in	Canton	Stadium	Capacity
FC Altstetten (Zürich)	Altstetten	Zürich	Buchlern	1,000
FC Arbon	Arbon	Thurgau	Stacherholz	1,000
GC Biaschesi	Biasca	Ticino	Campo Sportivo "Al Vallone"	2,850
FC Blue Stars Zürich	Zürich	Zürich	Hardhof	1,000
FC Chiasso	Chiasso	Ticino	Stadio Comunale Riva IV	4,000
FC Kreuzlingen	Kreuzlingen	Thurgau	Sportplatz Hafenareal	1,200
FC Mendrisio	Mendrisio	Ticino	Centro Sportivo Comunale	4,000
FC Olten	Olten	Solothurn	Sportanlagen Kleinholz	8,000
US Pro Daro	Bellinzona	Ticino	Campo Geretta / Stadio Comunale Bellinzona	500 / 5,000
FC Uster	Uster	Zürich	Sportanlage Buchholz	7,000
FC Winterthur	Winterthur	Zürich	Schützenwiese	8,550
SC Zofingen	Zofingen	Aargau	Sportanlagen Trinermatten	2,000

=== Final league table ===
Pos	Team	Pld	W	D	L	GF	GA	GD	Pts	Qualification or relegation
1	FC Chiasso	22	12	5	5	56	31	+25	29	Decider for first place
2	GC Biaschesi	22	12	5	5	41	34	+7	29	Decider for first place
3	SC Zofingen	22	11	6	5	42	27	+15	28	
4	FC Altstetten (Zürich)	22	9	6	7	30	27	+3	24	
5	FC Mendrisio	22	10	3	9	40	31	+9	23	
6	FC Arbon	22	8	7	7	43	41	+2	23	
7	FC Olten	22	8	5	9	33	36	−3	21	
8	FC Kreuzlingen	22	8	3	11	39	44	−5	19	
9	FC Uster	22	6	7	9	27	37	−10	19	
10	FC Blue Stars Zürich	22	7	3	12	30	46	−16	17	
11	FC Winterthur	22	5	7	10	24	41	−17	17	
12	US Pro Daro	22	5	5	12	33	43	−10	15	Relegation to 2. Liga

Source: RSSSF
Rules for classification: 1) Points; 2) Goal difference within the league, but decider play-off for qualifiers.

=== Decider for first place ===
The decider match for first place was played on 22 and 29 June 1947.

Team 1	Score	Team 2
FC Chiasso	2–0	GC Biaschesi
GC Biaschesi	0–1	FC Chiasso

FC Chiasso won and advanced to promotion play-offs. GC Biaschesi remained in the division for the following season.

== Promotion round ==
The three group winners played a single round-robin to decide the overall championship and the two promotion slots. The promotion play-offs were held on 29 June, 6 and 13 July 1947.

=== Promotion play-off ===
Pos	Team	Pld	W	D	L	GF	GA	GD	Pts	Qualification	CHI	CON	VEV
1	Chiasso	2	1	1	0	7	4	+3	3	Champions and promoted	—	5–2	—
2	Concordia	2	1	0	1	4	6	−2	2	Promoted	—	—	2–1
3	Vevey-Sports	2	0	1	1	3	4	−1	1		2–2	—	—

Source: RSSSF
Rules for classification: 1) Points; 2) Head-to-head 3) Decider.

Chiasso became overall 1. Liga Champions and together with runners-up Concordia were promoted to 1947–48 Nationalliga B. Vevey-Sports remained in the division for the next season.

== Further in Swiss football ==
- 1946–47 Nationalliga A
- 1946–47 Nationalliga B
- 1946–47 Swiss Cup

== Sources ==
- Switzerland 1946–47 at RSSSF

Preceded by 1945–46	Seasons in Swiss 1. Liga	Succeeded by 1947–48
