= 1947–48 Swiss 1. Liga =

1. Liga
- Season: 1947–48
- Champions: 1. Liga champions: Mendrisio; Group West: Vevey-Sports; Group Cenral: FC Pratteln; Group South and East: Mendrisio
- Promoted: Mendrisio; Vevey-Sports
- Relegated: Group West: FC Le Locle; Group Central: SR Delémont; Group South and East: SV Höngg
- Matches: 3 times 132 and 1 decider plus 3 play-offs

The 1947–48 1. Liga season was the 16th season of the 1. Liga since its creation in 1931. At this time, the 1. Liga was the third-tier of the Swiss football league system.

== Format ==
There were 36 teams competing in the 1. Liga this season. They were divided into three regional groups, each group with 12 teams. Within each group, the teams would play a double round-robin to decide their league position. Two points were awarded for a win and one point was awarded for a draw. The three group winners then contested a play-off round to decide the two promotion slots to the second-tier (NLB). The last placed team in each group were directly relegated to the 2. Liga (fourth tier).

== Group West ==
=== Teams, locations ===
Club	Based in	Canton	Stadium	Capacity
Ambrosiana Lausanne	Lausanne	Vaud		
FC Central Fribourg	Fribourg	Fribourg	Guintzet	2,000
FC Étoile-Sporting	La Chaux-de-Fonds	Neuchâtel	Les Foulets / Terrain des Eplatures	1,000 / 500
FC Gardy-Jonction	Geneva	Geneva		
FC Le Locle	Le Locle	Neuchâtel	Installation sportive - Jeanneret	3,142
FC Montreux-Sports	Montreux	Vaud	Stade de Chailly	1,000
Racing Club Lausanne	Lausanne	Vaud	Centre sportif de la Tuilière	1,000
FC Sierre	Sierre	Valais	Complexe Ecossia	2,000
FC Stade Lausanne	Ouchy, Lausanne	Vaud	Centre sportif de Vidy	1,000
FC Stade Nyonnais	Nyon	Vaud	Stade de Colovray	7,200
Vevey-Sports	Vevey	Vaud	Stade de Copet	4,000
Concordia Yverdon	Yverdon-les-Bains	Vaud	Stade Municipal	6,600

=== Final league table ===
Pos	Team	Pld	W	D	L	GF	GA	GD	Pts	Qualification or relegation
1	Vevey-Sports	22	16	2	4	47	23	+24	34	To promotion play-off
2	FC Sierre	22	14	2	6	52	31	+21	30	
3	Central Fribourg	22	13	3	6	71	36	+35	29	
4	FC Montreux-Sports	22	9	6	7	35	26	+9	24	
5	FC Étoile-Sporting	22	10	4	8	49	50	−1	24	
6	FC Ambrosiana Lausanne	22	10	2	10	31	40	−9	22	
7	FC Stade Lausanne	22	9	3	10	35	34	+1	21	
8	FC Stade Nyonnais	22	8	5	9	38	48	−10	21	
9	Concordia Yverdon	22	9	1	12	31	41	−10	19	
10	Racing Club Lausanne	22	9	1	12	24	36	−12	19	
11	FC Gardy-Jonction	22	3	6	13	31	47	−16	12	Play-out against relegation
12	FC Le Locle	22	3	3	16	29	61	−32	9	Relegation to 2. Liga

Source: RSSSF
Rules for classification: 1) Points; 2) Goal difference within the league, but decider play-off for qualifiers.

== Group Central ==
=== Teams, locations ===
Club	Based in	Canton	Stadium	Capacity
FC Birsfelden	Birsfelden	Basel-Landschaft	Sternenfeld	9,400
FC Black Stars Basel	Basel	Basel-Stadt	Buschwilerhof	1,200
SR Delémont	Delémont	Jura	La Blancherie	5,263
SC Derendingen	Derendingen	Solothurn	Heidenegg	1,500
FC Helvetia Bern	Bern	Bern	Spitalacker, Bern	1,000
SC Kleinhüningen	Basel	Basel-Stadt	Sportplatz Schorenmatte	300
FC Lengnau	Lengnau	Bern	Moos Lengnau BE	3,900
FC Moutier	Moutier	Bern	Stade de Chalière	5,000
FC Porrentruy	Porrentruy	Jura	Stade du Tirage	4,226
FC Pratteln	Pratteln	Basel-Landschaft	In den Sandgruben	5,000
SC Schöftland	Schöftland	Aargau	Sportanlage Rütimatten	2,000
FC Solothurn	Solothurn	Solothurn	Stadion FC Solothurn	6,750

=== Final league table ===
Pos	Team	Pld	W	D	L	GF	GA	GD	Pts	Qualification or relegation
1	FC Pratteln	22	12	6	4	59	44	+15	30	To promotion play-off
2	SC Derendingen	22	13	2	7	47	25	+22	28	
3	SC Kleinhüningen	22	10	8	4	53	34	+19	28	
4	FC Moutier	22	10	8	4	45	37	+8	28	
5	FC Black Stars Basel	22	8	5	9	42	47	−5	21	
6	FC Lengnau	22	9	3	10	36	43	−7	21	
7	FC Birsfelden	22	7	6	9	47	41	+6	20	
8	FC Solothurn	22	7	6	9	37	43	−6	20	
9	FC Helvetia Bern	22	7	6	9	44	49	−5	20	
10	SC Schöftland	22	7	5	10	54	61	−7	19	
11	FC Porrentruy	22	4	9	9	32	55	−23	17	Play-out against relegation
12	SR Delémont	22	2	8	12	27	44	−17	12	Relegation to 2. Liga

Source: RSSSF
Rules for classification: 1) Points; 2) Goal difference within the league, but decider play-off for qualifiers.

== Group South and East ==
=== Teams, locations ===
Club	Based in	Canton	Stadium	Capacity
FC Altstetten (Zürich)	Altstetten	Zürich	Buchlern	1,000
FC Arbon	Arbon	Thurgau	Stacherholz	1,000
GC Biaschesi	Biasca	Ticino	Campo Sportivo "Al Vallone"	2,850
FC Blue Stars Zürich	Zürich	Zürich	Hardhof	1,000
SV Höngg	Zürich	Zürich	Hönggerberg	1,000
FC Kreuzlingen	Kreuzlingen	Thurgau	Sportplatz Hafenareal	1,200
FC Mendrisio	Mendrisio	Ticino	Centro Sportivo Comunale	4,000
FC Olten	Olten	Solothurn	Sportanlagen Kleinholz	8,000
FC Red Star Zürich	Zürich	Zürich	Allmend Brunau	2,000
FC Uster	Uster	Zürich	Sportanlage Buchholz	7,000
FC Winterthur	Winterthur	Zürich	Schützenwiese	8,550
SC Zofingen	Zofingen	Aargau	Sportanlagen Trinermatten	2,000

=== Final league table ===
Pos	Team	Pld	W	D	L	GF	GA	GD	Pts	Qualification or relegation
1	FC Mendrisio	22	15	1	6	55	28	+27	31	Decider for first place
2	FC Red Star Zürich	22	14	3	5	44	25	+19	31	Decider for first place
3	FC Kreuzlingen	22	12	4	6	53	36	+17	28	
4	FC Olten	22	11	4	7	44	41	+3	26	
5	FC Blue Stars Zürich	22	11	3	8	41	34	+7	25	
6	FC Uster	22	11	2	9	36	43	−7	24	
7	FC Arbon	22	7	6	9	33	39	−6	20	
8	SC Zofingen	22	7	5	10	38	49	−11	19	
9	FC Winterthur	22	6	5	11	45	53	−8	17	
10	FC Altstetten (Zürich)	22	6	3	13	30	35	−5	15	
11	GC Biaschesi	22	6	3	13	28	46	−18	15	Play-out against relegation
12	SV Höngg	22	5	3	14	32	50	−18	13	Relegation to 2. Liga

Source: RSSSF
Rules for classification: 1) Points; 2) Goal difference within the league, but decider play-off for qualifiers.

=== Decider for first place ===
The decider match for first place in the group was played on 6 June 1948 in Olten.

Team 1	Score	Team 2
Mendrisio	2–1	Red Star

Mendrisio won, became group champions and advanced to the play-offs. Red Star remained in the division for the following season.

== Promotion ==
The three group winners played a single round-robin to decide the overall championship and the two promotion slots. The promotion play-offs were held on 13, 20 and 27 June 1948.

=== Promotion play-off ===
Pos	Team	Pld	W	D	L	GF	GA	GD	Pts	Qualification	MEN	VEV	PRA
1	Mendrisio	2	2	0	0	7	3	+4	4	Champions and promoted	—	2–1	—
2	Vevey-Sports	2	1	0	1	4	4	0	2	Promoted	—	—	3–2
3	FC Pratteln	2	0	0	2	4	8	−4	0		2–5	—	—

Source: RSSSF
Rules for classification: 1) Points; 2) Head-to-head 3) Decider.

Mendrisio became overall 1. Liga Champions and together with runners-up Vevey-Sports were promoted to 1948–49 Nationalliga B. FC Pratteln remained in the division for the next season.

== Further in Swiss football ==
- 1947–48 Nationalliga A
- 1947–48 Nationalliga B
- 1947–48 Swiss Cup

== Sources ==
- Switzerland 1948–49 at RSSSF

Preceded by 1946–47	Seasons in Swiss 1. Liga	Succeeded by 1948–49
