= 1945–46 Swiss 1. Liga =

1. Liga
- Season: 1945–46
- Champions: 1. Liga champions: Red Star; Group West: Thun; Group Cenral: Concordia; Group South and East: Red Star
- Promoted: Red Star; Thun
- Relegated: Group West: FC Sion; Group Central: FC Tramelan; Group South and East: FC Adliswil
- Matches: 3 times 132 plus 3 play-offs

The 1945–46 1. Liga season was the 14th season of the 1. Liga since its creation in 1931. At this time, the 1. Liga was the third-tier of the Swiss football league system.

== Format ==
There were 33 teams competing in the 1. Liga this season. They were divided into three regional groups, each group with 11 teams. Within each group, the teams would play a double round-robin to decide their league position. Two points were awarded for a win and one point was awarded for a draw. The three group winners then contested a play-off round to decide the two promotion slots to the second-tier (NLB). The last placed team in each group was directly relegated to the 2. Liga (fourth tier). The season started on 9 September 1945, was completed by 23 June 1946 with two of the games in the promotion play-off being held in July.

The following season would see the 1. Liga with the addition of three further clubs, thus the number of teams in each group was to be new twelve teams, therefore six clubs from the 2. Liga (fourth tier) would be promoted this season.

== Group West ==
=== Teams, locations ===
| Club | Based in | Canton | Stadium | Capacity |
|---|---|---|---|---|
| FC Central Fribourg | Fribourg | Fribourg | Guintzet | 2,000 |
| FC Gardy-Jonction | Geneva | Geneva | | |
| FC Le Locle | Le Locle | Neuchâtel | Installation sportive - Jeanneret | 3,142 |
| FC Montreux-Sports | Montreux | Vaud | Stade de Chailly | 1,000 |
| Racing Club Lausanne | Lausanne | Vaud | Centre sportif de la Tuilière | 1,000 |
| FC Renens | Renens | Vaud | Zone sportive du Censuy | 2,300 |
| FC Sierre | Sierre | Valais | Complexe Ecossia | 2,000 |
| FC Sion | Sion | Valais | Parc des sports (Tourbillon) | 8,000 |
| FC Thun | Thun | Bern | Stadion Lachen | 10,350 |
| Vevey-Sports | Vevey | Vaud | Stade de Copet | 4,000 |
| Concordia Yverdon | Yverdon-les-Bains | Vaud | Stade Municipal | 6,600 |

=== Final league table ===
| Pos | Team | Pld | W | D | L | GF | GA | GD | Pts | Qualification or relegation |
|---|---|---|---|---|---|---|---|---|---|---|
| 1 | FC Thun | 20 | 16 | 2 | 2 | 48 | 24 | +24 | 34 | To promotion play-off |
| 2 | Vevey-Sports | 20 | 11 | 4 | 5 | 42 | 24 | +18 | 26 | |
| 3 | FC Gardy-Jonction | 20 | 10 | 2 | 8 | 42 | 38 | +4 | 22 | |
| 4 | FC Le Locle | 20 | 8 | 5 | 7 | 36 | 29 | +7 | 21 | |
| 5 | Central Fribourg | 20 | 9 | 2 | 9 | 51 | 42 | +9 | 20 | |
| 6 | Concordia Yverdon | 20 | 9 | 2 | 9 | 26 | 29 | −3 | 20 | |
| 7 | FC Sierre | 20 | 10 | 0 | 10 | 39 | 44 | −5 | 20 | |
| 8 | Racing Club Lausanne | 20 | 8 | 4 | 8 | 29 | 37 | −8 | 20 | |
| 9 | FC Montreux-Sports | 20 | 6 | 4 | 10 | 28 | 39 | −11 | 16 | |
| 10 | FC Renens | 20 | 4 | 4 | 12 | 28 | 37 | −9 | 12 | |
| 11 | FC Sion | 20 | 3 | 3 | 14 | 19 | 45 | −26 | 9 | Relegation to 2. Liga |

Source: RSSSF
Rules for classification: 1) Points; 2) Goal difference within the league, but decider play-off for qualifiers.

== Group Central ==
=== Teams, locations ===
| Club | Based in | Canton | Stadium | Capacity |
|---|---|---|---|---|
| FC Birsfelden | Birsfelden | Basel-Landschaft | Sternenfeld | 9,400 |
| FC Concordia Basel | Basel | Basel-Stadt | Stadion Rankhof | 7,000 |
| SC Kleinhüningen | Basel | Basel-Stadt | Sportplatz Schorenmatte | 300 |
| FC Moutier | Moutier | Bern | Stade de Chalière | 5,000 |
| FC Olten | Olten | Solothurn | Sportanlagen Kleinholz | 8,000 |
| FC Porrentruy | Porrentruy | Jura | Stade du Tirage | 4,226 |
| FC Pratteln | Pratteln | Basel-Landschaft | In den Sandgruben | 5,000 |
| FC Solothurn | Solothurn | Solothurn | Stadion FC Solothurn | 6,750 |
| SC Schöftland | Schöftland | Aargau | Sportanlage Rütimatten | 2,000 |
| FC Tramelan | Tramelan | Bern | Bâloise Stadium / (Allianz Suisse Stadium) | 1,500 / (1,800) |
| SC Zofingen | Zofingen | Aargau | Sportanlagen Trinermatten | 2,000 |

=== Final league table ===
| Pos | Team | Pld | W | D | L | GF | GA | GD | Pts | Qualification or relegation |
|---|---|---|---|---|---|---|---|---|---|---|
| 1 | FC Concordia Basel | 20 | 14 | 1 | 5 | 47 | 29 | +18 | 29 | To promotion play-off |
| 2 | SC Schöftland | 20 | 11 | 5 | 4 | 56 | 31 | +25 | 27 | |
| 3 | FC Birsfelden | 20 | 9 | 8 | 3 | 42 | 32 | +10 | 26 | |
| 4 | FC Moutier | 20 | 10 | 5 | 5 | 38 | 24 | +14 | 25 | |
| 5 | FC Pratteln | 20 | 7 | 8 | 5 | 30 | 19 | +11 | 22 | |
| 6 | SC Kleinhüningen | 20 | 6 | 8 | 6 | 26 | 27 | −1 | 20 | |
| 7 | FC Porrentruy | 20 | 7 | 6 | 7 | 31 | 37 | −6 | 20 | |
| 8 | FC Olten | 20 | 5 | 7 | 8 | 27 | 34 | −7 | 17 | |
| 9 | SC Zofingen | 20 | 5 | 5 | 10 | 28 | 42 | −14 | 15 | |
| 10 | FC Solothurn | 20 | 3 | 8 | 9 | 21 | 32 | −11 | 14 | |
| 11 | FC Tramelan | 20 | 1 | 3 | 16 | 18 | 57 | −39 | 5 | Relegation to 2. Liga |

Source: RSSSF
Rules for classification: 1) Points; 2) Goal difference within the league, but decider play-off for qualifiers.

== Group South and East ==
=== Teams, locations ===
| Club | Based in | Canton | Stadium | Capacity |
|---|---|---|---|---|
| FC Adliswil | Adliswil | Zürich | Tüfi / Tal | 1,000 / 1,000 |
| FC Altstetten (Zürich) | Altstetten | Zürich | Buchlern | 1,000 |
| FC Arbon | Arbon | Thurgau | Stacherholz | 1,000 |
| FC Blue Stars Zürich | Zürich | Zürich | Hardhof | 1,000 |
| FC Chiasso | Chiasso | Ticino | Stadio Comunale Riva IV | 4,000 |
| FC Gränichen | Gränichen | Aargau | ZehnderMatte | 1,000 |
| FC Mendrisio | Mendrisio | Ticino | Centro Sportivo Comunale | 4,000 |
| US Pro Daro | Bellinzona | Ticino | Campo Geretta / Stadio Comunale Bellinzona | 500 / 5,000 |
| FC Red Star Zürich | Zürich | Zürich | Allmend Brunau | 2,000 |
| FC Uster | Uster | Zürich | Sportanlage Buchholz | 7,000 |
| FC Winterthur | Winterthur | Zürich | Schützenwiese | 8,550 |

=== Final league table ===
| Pos | Team | Pld | W | D | L | GF | GA | GD | Pts | Qualification or relegation |
|---|---|---|---|---|---|---|---|---|---|---|
| 1 | FC Red Star Zürich | 20 | 13 | 4 | 3 | 34 | 19 | +15 | 30 | To promotion play-off |
| 2 | FC Mendrisio | 20 | 13 | 2 | 5 | 37 | 22 | +15 | 28 | |
| 3 | FC Chiasso | 20 | 10 | 3 | 7 | 30 | 30 | 0 | 23 | |
| 4 | US Pro Daro | 20 | 10 | 1 | 9 | 27 | 35 | −8 | 21 | |
| 5 | FC Winterthur | 20 | 8 | 4 | 8 | 37 | 30 | +7 | 20 | |
| 6 | FC Arbon | 20 | 8 | 3 | 9 | 41 | 35 | +6 | 19 | |
| 7 | FC Blue Stars Zürich | 20 | 8 | 3 | 9 | 35 | 40 | −5 | 19 | |
| 8 | FC Uster | 20 | 6 | 5 | 9 | 32 | 40 | −8 | 17 | |
| 9 | FC Altstetten (Zürich) | 20 | 6 | 4 | 10 | 35 | 44 | −9 | 16 | |
| 10 | FC Gränichen | 20 | 7 | 1 | 12 | 34 | 29 | +5 | 15 | |
| 11 | FC Adliswil | 20 | 5 | 2 | 13 | 33 | 51 | −18 | 12 | Relegation to 2. Liga |

Source: RSSSF
Rules for classification: 1) Points; 2) Goal difference within the league, but decider play-off for qualifiers.

== Promotion ==
The three group winners played a single round-robin to decide the overall championship and the two promotion slots. The promotion play-offs were held on 16 June, 21 and 28 July 1946.

=== Promotion play-off ===
| Pos | Team | Pld | W | D | L | GF | GA | GD | Pts | Qualification | RED | TUN | CON |
|---|---|---|---|---|---|---|---|---|---|---|---|---|---|
| 1 | Red Star | 2 | 1 | 1 | 0 | 3 | 2 | +1 | 3 | Champions and promoted | — | 1–0 | — |
| 2 | Thun | 2 | 1 | 0 | 1 | 2 | 2 | 0 | 2 | Promoted | — | — | 2–1 |
| 3 | Concordia | 2 | 0 | 1 | 1 | 3 | 4 | −1 | 1 | | 2–2 | — | — |

Source: RSSSF
Rules for classification: 1) Points; 2) Head-to-head 3) Decider.

Red Star became overall 1. Liga Champions and together with runners-up Thun were promoted to 1946–47 Nationalliga B. Concordia remained in the division for the next season.

== Further in Swiss football ==
- 1945–46 Nationalliga A
- 1945–46 Nationalliga B
- 1945–46 Swiss Cup

== Sources ==
- Switzerland 1945–46 at RSSSF

| Preceded by 1944–45 | Seasons in Swiss 1. Liga | Succeeded by 1946–47 |
