= 1945–46 BSC Young Boys season =

BSC Young Boys
1945–46 season
- Chairman: Otto Wirz
- Manager: Béla Volentik
- Stadium: Stadion Wankdorf
- Nationalliga A: 12th
- Swiss Cup: Winners

The 1945–46 season was the 46th season in the history of Berner Sport Club Young Boys. The team played their home games at Stadion Wankdorf in Bern.

== Players ==
- Maurice Glur
- Hans Flühmann
- Louis Gobet
- Albert Stoll
- Ernst Giacometti
- Eugène Walaschek
- Fritz Knecht
- Hans Blaser
- Walter Streun
- Hans Trachsel
- Klossner

== Friendlies ==
Win Draw Loss

26 August 1945 Friendly	Young Boys (Switzerland)	3–3	(Switzerland) Zürich	Langenthal
				Attendance: 1,000; Referee: Ernst Dörflinger

== Competitions ==
=== Overall record ===
Competition	First match	Last match	Starting round	Final position	Record							
Competition	First match	Last match	Starting round	Final position	Pld	W	D	L	GF	GA	GD	Win %
Nationalliga A	9 September 1945	23 June 1946	Matchday 1	12th	26	8	6	12	42	49	−7	30.77
Swiss Cup	25 November 1945	7 April 1946	3rd principal round	Semi-finals	5	4	0	1	11	5	+6	80.00
Total					31	12	6	13	53	54	−1	38.71

Source: Competitions

=== Nationalliga A ===
==== League table ====
Pos	Team	Pld	W	D	L	GF	GA	GD	Pts	Qualification or relegation
10	Bern	26	9	7	10	36	44	−8	25	
11	Grenchen	26	8	7	11	34	34	0	23	
12	Young Boys	26	8	6	12	42	49	−7	22	
13	La Chaux-de-Fonds	26	6	6	14	32	70	−38	18	Relegated to 1946–47 NLB
14	Zürich	26	5	6	15	31	43	−12	16	Relegated to 1946–47 NLB

Source: rsssf.com
Rules for classification: 1) Points; 2) Goal difference within the league, however with play-off for qualifiers;

==== Matches ====
9 September 1945 1	Young Boys	2–1	Lausanne-Sport	Bern
	Willy Bernhard 24'; Walter Streun 60'		Gaston Morgenegg 46'	Stadium: Stadion Wankdorf; Attendance: 3,500; Referee: Armand Merlotti

23 September 1945 2	La Chaux-de-Fonds	1–1	Young Boys	La Chaux-de-Fonds
	Wilhelm Kernen 60'		Hans Blaser 44'	Stadium: Stade de la Charrière; Attendance: 2,000; Referee: Ernst Dörflinger

30 September 1945 3	Young Boys	1–1	FC Bern	Bern
				Stadium: Stadion Wankdorf; Attendance: 6,000; Referee: Hans Vogt

7 October 1945 4	Zürich	0–1	Young Boys	Zürich
				Stadium: Letzigrund; Attendance: 4,000; Referee: Jean Lutz

14 October 1945 5	Young Boys	2–1	Grasshopper Club Zürich	Bern
				Stadium: Stadion Wankdorf; Attendance: 7,000; Referee: Ernst Dörflinger

21 October 1945 6	Bellinzona	4–0	Young Boys	Bellinzona
				Stadium: Campo via Stefano Franscini; Attendance: 3,500; Referee: Willy Rufli

28 October 1945 7	Young Boys	3–2	Servette	Bern
				Stadium: Stadion Wankdorf; Attendance: 6,000; Referee: Joseph Schürch

4 November 1945 8	Cantonal Neuchâtel	0–0	Young Boys	Neuchâtel
				Stadium: Stade de la Maladière; Attendance: 3,800; Referee: Hans Vogt

18 November 1945 9	Young Boys	1–0	Biel-Bienne	Bern
				Stadium: Stadion Wankdorf; Attendance: 3,000; Referee: Roger Rapin

2 December 1945 10	Young Boys	1–2	Grenchen	Bern
				Stadium: Stadion Wankdorf; Attendance: 3,000; Referee: Rosenbaum

9 December 1945 11	Young Fellows Zürich	4–3	Young Boys	Zürich
				Stadium: Letzigrund; Attendance: 2,500; Referee: Armand Merlotti

16 December 1945 12	Young Boys	2–1	Locarno	Bern
				Stadium: Stadion Wankdorf; Attendance: 3,000; Referee: Ernst Dörflinger

23 December 1945 13	Lugano	2–0	Young Boys	Lugano
				Stadium: Campo Marzio; Attendance: 2,000; Referee: Joseph Schürch

24 February 1946 14	Lausanne-Sport	4–2	Young Boys	Lausanne
				Stadium: Stade de la Pontaise; Attendance: 3,000; Referee: Joseph Schürch

3 March 1946 15	Young Boys	6–1	La Chaux-de-Fonds	Bern
				Stadium: Stadion Wankdorf; Attendance: 1,500; Referee: Mario Grassi

10 March 1946 16	FC Bern	2–2	Young Boys	Bern
				Stadium: Stadion Neufeld; Attendance: 7,000; Referee: Ernst Dörflinger

24 March 1946 17	Young Boys	1–3	Zürich	Bern
				Stadium: Stadion Wankdorf; Attendance: 3,500; Referee: Hans Vogt

31 March 1946 18	Grasshopper Club Zürich	2–2	Young Boys	Zürich
				Stadium: Hardturm; Attendance: 10,000; Referee: Armand Merlotti

14 April 1946 19	Young Boys	2–4	Bellinzona	Bern
				Stadium: Stadion Wankdorf; Attendance: 2,500; Referee: Adrien Sandoz

28 April 1946 20	Servette	1–0	Young Boys	Geneva
				Stadium: Stade des Charmilles; Attendance: 8,000; Referee: Ernst Dörflinger

5 May 1946 21	Young Boys	1–3	Cantonal Neuchâtel	Bern
				Stadium: Stadion Wankdorf; Attendance: 2,000; Referee: Georges Craviolini

19 May 1946 22	Biel-Bienne	3–1	Young Boys	Biel/Bienne
				Stadium: Stadion Gurzelen; Attendance: 2,500; Referee: Hans Vogt

26 May 1946 23	Grenchen	0–4	Young Boys	Grenchen
				Stadium: Stadion Brühl; Attendance: 1,200; Referee: Adrien Sandoz

30 May 1946 24	Young Boys	2–2	Young Fellows Zürich	Bern
				Stadium: Stadion Wankdorf; Attendance: 2,500; Referee: Louis Tschopp

16 June 1946 25	Locarno	3–1	Young Boys	Locarno
				Stadium: Stadio del Lido; Attendance: 1,500; Referee: Joseph Schürch

23 June 1946 26	Young Boys	1–2	Lugano	Bern
	Walter Streun 52'		Roberto Bergamini 21', 39'	Stadium: Stadion Wankdorf; Attendance: 4,000; Referee: Armand Merlotti

=== Swiss Cup ===
25 November 1945 3rd principal round	Thun	1–2 (a.e.t.)	Young Boys	Thun
				Stadium: Grabengut

6 January 1946 Round of 32	FC Solothurn	1–2	Young Boys	Solothurn
				Stadium: Stadion FC Solothurn

10 February 1946 Round of 16	Young Boys	5–1	Aarau	Bern
				Stadium: Stadion Wankdorf

17 March 1946 Quarter-finals	Locarno	0–2	Young Boys	Locarno
				Stadium: Stadio del Lido

7 April 1946 Semi-finals	Young Boys	0–2	Grasshopper Club Zürich	Bern
			Bickel II; Amado 77'	Stadium: Stadion Wankdorf
