= 1947–48 Nationalliga A =

Swiss football season

Nationalliga A
- Season: 1947–48
- Champions: Bellinzona
- Relegated: Bern; Cantonal Neuchâtel
- Top goalscorer: Josef Righetti (Grenchen); 26 goals

Nationalliga B
- Season: 1947–48
- Champions: Urania Genève Sport
- Promoted: Urania Genève Sport; Chiasso
- Relegated: Concordia; Schaffhausen

The following is the summary of the Swiss National League in the 1947–48 football season, both Nationalliga A and Nationalliga B. This was the 51st season of top-tier and the 50th season of second-tier football in Switzerland.

== Overview ==
The Swiss Football Association (ASF/SFV) had 28 member clubs at this time which were divided into two divisions of 14 teams each. The teams played a double round-robin to decide their table positions. Two points were awarded for a win and one point was awarded for a draw. The top tier (NLA) was contested by the top 12 teams from the previous season and the two newly promoted teams FC Zürich and FC La Chaux-de-Fonds. The last two teams in the league table at the end of the season were to be relegated.

The second-tier (NLB) was contested by the two teams that had been relegated from the NLA at the end of the last season, these were Urania Genève Sport and BSC Young Boys, the ten teams that had been in third to twelfth position last season and the two newly promoted teams from the 1. Liga FC Chiasso and FC Concordia Basel. The top two teams at the end of the season would be promoted to the 1948–49 NLA and the two last placed teams would be relegated to the 1948–49 Swiss 1. Liga.

== Nationalliga A ==
=== Teams, locations ===
| Team | Based in | Canton | Stadium | Capacity |
|---|---|---|---|---|
| FC Basel | Basel | Basel-Stadt | Landhof | 4,000 |
| AC Bellinzona | Bellinzona | Ticino | Stadio Comunale Bellinzona | 5,000 |
| FC Bern | Bern | Bern | Stadion Neufeld | 14,000 |
| FC Biel-Bienne | Biel/Bienne | Bern | Stadion Gurzelen | 5,500 |
| FC Cantonal Neuchâtel | Neuchâtel | Neuchâtel | Stade de la Maladière | 25,500 |
| Grasshopper Club Zürich | Zürich | Zürich | Hardturm | 20,000 |
| FC Grenchen | Grenchen | Solothurn | Stadium Brühl | 15,100 |
| FC La Chaux-de-Fonds | La Chaux-de-Fonds | Neuchâtel | Centre Sportif de la Charrière | 10,000 |
| FC Lausanne-Sport | Lausanne | Vaud | Pontaise | 30,000 |
| FC Locarno | Locarno | Ticino | Stadio comunale Lido | 5,000 |
| FC Lugano | Lugano | Ticino | Cornaredo Stadium | 6,330 |
| Servette FC | Geneva | Geneva | Stade des Charmilles | 27,000 |
| FC Young Fellows | Zürich | Zürich | Utogrund | 2,850 |
| FC Zürich | Zürich | Zürich | Letzigrund | 25,000 |

=== Final league table ===
| Pos | Team | Pld | W | D | L | GF | GA | GD | Pts | Qualification or relegation |
|---|---|---|---|---|---|---|---|---|---|---|
| 1 | Bellinzona (C) | 26 | 15 | 8 | 3 | 58 | 28 | +30 | 38 | Swiss Champions |
| 2 | Biel-Bienne | 26 | 16 | 5 | 5 | 57 | 38 | +19 | 37 | |
| 3 | Lausanne-Sport | 26 | 16 | 2 | 8 | 59 | 32 | +27 | 34 | |
| 4 | La Chaux-de-Fonds | 26 | 12 | 4 | 10 | 73 | 54 | +19 | 28 | Swiss Cup winners |
| 5 | Servette | 26 | 10 | 6 | 10 | 61 | 51 | +10 | 26 | |
| 6 | Grenchen | 26 | 10 | 6 | 10 | 53 | 58 | −5 | 26 | |
| 7 | Locarno | 26 | 10 | 5 | 11 | 43 | 45 | −2 | 25 | |
| 8 | Grasshopper Club | 26 | 9 | 6 | 11 | 60 | 52 | +8 | 24 | |
| 9 | Zürich | 26 | 10 | 4 | 12 | 54 | 60 | −6 | 24 | |
| 10 | Basel | 26 | 7 | 10 | 9 | 44 | 51 | −7 | 24 | |
| 11 | Lugano | 26 | 9 | 6 | 11 | 34 | 44 | −10 | 24 | |
| 12 | Young Fellows Zürich | 26 | 9 | 5 | 12 | 41 | 45 | −4 | 23 | |
| 13 | Bern (R) | 26 | 8 | 5 | 13 | 28 | 56 | −28 | 21 | Relegated to 1948–49 NLB |
| 14 | Cantonal Neuchatel (R) | 26 | 2 | 6 | 18 | 34 | 85 | −51 | 10 | Relegated to 1948–49 NLB |

Source: rsssf.com
Rules for classification: 1) Points; 2) Goal difference within the league, however with play-off for qualifiers;
(C) Champions; (R) Relegated

This was Bellinzona's first championship title.

=== Results ===
| Home \ Away | BAS | BEL | BER | BB | CAN | CDF | GCZ | GRE | LS | LOC | LUG | SER | YFZ | ZÜR |
|---|---|---|---|---|---|---|---|---|---|---|---|---|---|---|
| Basel | | 5–1 | 1–2 | 3–3 | 4–1 | 2–2 | 2–2 | 2–2 | 1–3 | 2–1 | 0–1 | 3–2 | 2–0 | 3–3 |
| Bellinzona | 0–0 | | 6–0 | 1–0 | 6–1 | 3–2 | 2–1 | 4–0 | 3–0 | 1–1 | 1–0 | 0–0 | 5–1 | 5–3 |
| Bern | 2–0 | 1–4 | | 0–2 | 0–1 | 1–3 | 0–5 | 2–2 | 2–0 | 1–1 | 1–1 | 2–4 | 1–0 | 1–3 |
| Biel-Bienne | 1–0 | 4–0 | 2–0 | | 2–1 | 2–0 | 4–1 | 4–7 | 0–0 | 2–1 | 2–0 | 2–2 | 4–1 | 4–1 |
| Cantonal Neuchâtel | 0–2 | 1–1 | 0–3 | 2–2 | | 2–3 | 1–6 | 3–5 | 0–1 | 1–1 | 1–1 | 3–3 | 2–2 | 1–2 |
| La Chaux-de-Fonds | 1–5 | 1–4 | 5–0 | 2–0 | 13–0 | | 3–3 | 4–0 | 2–3 | 5–1 | 2–0 | 1–1 | 2–3 | 4–1 |
| Grasshopper Club | 3–0 | 1–2 | 1–1 | 1–3 | 1–3 | 1–5 | | 5–3 | 1–2 | 3–1 | 6–0 | 4–3 | 2–2 | 4–2 |
| Grenchen | 2–2 | 1–1 | 2–0 | 2–3 | 2–1 | 3–1 | 0–0 | | 2–1 | 2–4 | 3–0 | 4–3 | 2–0 | 2–0 |
| Lausanne-Sports | 5–0 | 1–5 | 2–3 | 6–1 | 8–1 | 0–3 | 2–1 | 3–1 | | 2–0 | 3–0 | 5–0 | 1–4 | 3–1 |
| Locarno | 3–0 | 1–1 | 4–0 | 2–0 | 3–2 | 4–2 | 1–0 | 5–2 | 1–3 | | 3–1 | 1–0 | 0–0 | 1–3 |
| Lugano | 1–1 | 0–0 | 1–2 | 1–3 | 4–0 | 6–1 | 2–1 | 3–0 | 0–0 | 3–0 | | 2–0 | 1–1 | 2–1 |
| Servette | 1–1 | 0–0 | 4–1 | 2–3 | 4–1 | 4–2 | 6–4 | 3–1 | 0–1 | 2–0 | 8–1 | | 3–0 | 3–4 |
| Young Fellows | 5–0 | 3–1 | 0–0 | 0–3 | 4–2 | 1–4 | 0–1 | 2–1 | 2–1 | 2–0 | 1–2 | 0–1 | | 5–2 |
| Zürich | 3–3 | 0–1 | 3–1 | 1–2 | 1–4 | 2–2 | 3–1 | 2–2 | 0–1 | 5–1 | 3–1 | 3–2 | 2–1 | |

Source: rsssf.com
Legend: Blue = home team win; Yellow = draw; Red = away team win.

=== Topscorers ===
| Rank | Player | Nat. | Goals | Club |
|---|---|---|---|---|
| 1. | Josef Righetti | (Switzerland) | 26 | Grenchen |
| 2. | Charles Antenen | (Switzerland) | 20 | La Chaux-de-Fonds |
| 3. | Ledio Zanetti | (Switzerland) | 18 | Zürich |
| 4. | Jacques Fatton | (Switzerland) | 17 | Servette |
| 5. | Milorad Nikolić | (Socialist Federal Republic of Yugoslavia) | 16 | Lausanne-Sport |
| 6. | Hans Siegenthaler | (Switzerland) | 15 | Young Fellows Zürich |
| 6. | Jean Tamini | (Switzerland) | 15 | Servette |
| 8. | Walter Bosshard | (Switzerland) | 14 | Zürich |
| 8. | Willy Kernen | (Switzerland) | 14 | La Chaux-de-Fonds |
| 10. | Augusto Satori | (Switzerland) | 13 | Bellinzona |
| 10. | René Maillard | (Switzerland) | 13 | Lausanne-Sport |
| 10. | Lauro Amadò | (Switzerland) | 13 | Grasshopper Club |

== Nationalliga B ==
=== Teams, locations ===
| Team | Based in | Canton | Stadium | Capacity |
|---|---|---|---|---|
| FC Aarau | Aarau | Aargau | Stadion Brügglifeld | 9,240 |
| SC Brühl | St. Gallen | St. Gallen | Paul-Grüninger-Stadion | 4,200 |
| FC Chiasso | Chiasso | Ticino | Stadio Comunale Riva IV | 4,000 |
| FC Concordia Basel | Basel | Basel-Stadt | Stadion Rankhof | 7,000 |
| FC Fribourg | Fribourg | Fribourg | Stade Universitaire | 9,000 |
| CS International Genève | Geneva | Geneva | | |
| FC Luzern | Lucerne | Lucerne | Stadion Allmend | 25,000 |
| FC Nordstern Basel | Basel | Basel-Stadt | Rankhof | 7,600 |
| FC Schaffhausen | Schaffhausen | Schaffhausen | Stadion Breite | 7,300 |
| FC St. Gallen | St. Gallen | St. Gallen | Espenmoos | 11,000 |
| FC Thun | Thun | Bern | Stadion Lachen | 10,350 |
| Urania Genève Sport | Genève | Geneva | Stade de Frontenex | 4,000 |
| BSC Young Boys | Bern | Bern | Wankdorf Stadium | 56,000 |
| SC Zug | Zug | Zug | Herti Allmend Stadion | 6,000 |

=== Final league table ===
| Pos | Team | Pld | W | D | L | GF | GA | GD | Pts | Qualification or relegation |
|---|---|---|---|---|---|---|---|---|---|---|
| 1 | Urania Genève Sport | 26 | 17 | 2 | 7 | 57 | 28 | +29 | 36 | To play-off for NLB championship |
| 2 | FC Chiasso | 26 | 15 | 6 | 5 | 63 | 34 | +29 | 36 | To play-off for NLB championship |
| 3 | FC Fribourg | 26 | 13 | 8 | 5 | 54 | 42 | +12 | 34 | |
| 4 | Young Boys | 26 | 10 | 10 | 6 | 55 | 39 | +16 | 30 | |
| 5 | FC St. Gallen | 26 | 11 | 6 | 9 | 55 | 43 | +12 | 28 | |
| 6 | FC Nordstern Basel | 26 | 12 | 4 | 10 | 54 | 48 | +6 | 28 | |
| 7 | SC Brühl | 26 | 10 | 6 | 10 | 57 | 49 | +8 | 26 | |
| 8 | Luzern | 26 | 9 | 8 | 9 | 46 | 42 | +4 | 26 | |
| 9 | FC Aarau | 26 | 10 | 6 | 10 | 40 | 42 | −2 | 26 | |
| 10 | CS International Genève | 26 | 8 | 8 | 10 | 35 | 39 | −4 | 24 | |
| 11 | SC Zug | 26 | 7 | 9 | 10 | 38 | 49 | −11 | 23 | |
| 12 | FC Thun | 26 | 4 | 10 | 12 | 24 | 60 | −36 | 18 | |
| 13 | FC Concordia Basel | 26 | 7 | 1 | 18 | 38 | 66 | −28 | 15 | Relegated to 1948–49 1. Liga |
| 14 | FC Schaffhausen | 26 | 4 | 6 | 16 | 34 | 69 | −35 | 14 | Relegated to 1948–49 1. Liga |

Source: RSSSF
Rules for classification: 1) Points; 2) Goal difference within the league, however with play-off for qualifiers;

=== Decider for NLB championship ===
Urania Genève Sport and FC Chiasso finished the season level on points in joint first position and both achieved promotion to 1948–49 Nationalliga A. However, it required a play-off to decide the division championship. The play-off was played on 20 June 1948 at the Letzigrund in Zürich.

| Team 1 | Score | Team 2 |
|---|---|---|
| Urania Genève Sport | 4–3 | FC Chiasso |

Urania Genève Sport won and were NLB champions.

== Further in Swiss football ==
- 1947–48 Swiss Cup
- 1947–48 Swiss 1. Liga

== Sources ==
- Switzerland 1947–48 at RSSSF

| Preceded by 1946–47 | Nationalliga seasons in Switzerland | Succeeded by 1948–49 |
