= 1946–47 Nationalliga A =

Swiss football season

Nationalliga A
- Season: 1946–47
- Champions: Biel-Bienne
- Relegated: Young Boys; Urania Genève Sport
- Top goalscorer: Lauro Amadò (GC); Hans Blaser (YB) both 19 goals

Nationalliga B
- Season: 1946–47
- Champions: Zürich
- Promoted: Zürich; La Chaux-de-Fonds
- Relegated: Red Star; FC Helvetia Bern

The following is the summary of the Swiss National League in the 1946–47 football season, both Nationalliga A and Nationalliga B. This was the 50th season of top-tier and the 49th season of second-tier football in Switzerland.

== Overview ==
The Swiss Football Association (ASF/SFV) had 28 member clubs at this time which were divided into two divisions of 14 teams each. The teams played a double round-robin to decide their table positions. Two points were awarded for a win and one point was awarded for a draw. The top tier (NLA) was contested by the top 12 teams from the previous season and the two newly promoted teams FC Basel and Urania Genève Sport. The last two teams in the league table at the end of the season were to be relegated.

The second-tier (NLB) was contested by the two teams that had been relegated from the NLA at the end of the last season, these were FC Zürich and FC La Chaux-de-Fonds, the ten teams that had been in third to twelfth position last season and the two newly promoted teams from the 1. Liga FC Red Star and FC Thun. The top two teams at the end of the season would be promoted to the 1947–48 NLA and the two last placed teams would be relegated to the 1947–48 1. Liga.

== Nationalliga A ==
=== Teams, locations ===
Team	Based in	Canton	Stadium	Capacity
FC Basel	Basel	Basel-Stadt	Landhof	4,000
AC Bellinzona	Bellinzona	Ticino	Stadio Comunale Bellinzona	5,000
FC Bern	Bern	Bern	Stadion Neufeld	14,000
FC Biel-Bienne	Biel/Bienne	Bern	Stadion Gurzelen	5,500
FC Cantonal Neuchâtel	Neuchâtel	Neuchâtel	Stade de la Maladière	25,500
Grasshopper Club Zürich	Zürich	Zürich	Hardturm	20,000
FC Grenchen	Grenchen	Solothurn	Stadium Brühl	15,100
FC Lausanne-Sport	Lausanne	Vaud	Pontaise	30,000
FC Locarno	Locarno	Ticino	Stadio comunale Lido	5,000
FC Lugano	Lugano	Ticino	Cornaredo Stadium	6,330
Servette FC	Geneva	Geneva	Stade des Charmilles	27,000
Urania Genève Sport	Genève	Geneva	Stade de Frontenex	4,000
BSC Young Boys	Bern	Bern	Wankdorf Stadium	56,000
FC Young Fellows	Zürich	Zürich	Utogrund	2,850

=== Final league table ===
Pos	Team	Pld	W	D	L	GF	GA	GD	Pts	Qualification or relegation
1	Biel-Bienne	26	14	8	4	60	32	+28	36	Swiss Champions
2	Lausanne-Sport	26	15	5	6	44	25	+19	35	
3	Lugano	26	10	11	5	34	26	+8	31	
4	Basel	26	12	5	9	60	45	+15	29	Swiss Cup winners
5	Servette	26	11	6	9	54	49	+5	28	
6	Grasshopper Club	26	12	3	11	61	42	+19	27	
7	Grenchen	26	10	6	10	36	30	+6	26	
8	Young Fellows Zürich	26	9	8	9	49	46	+3	26	
9	Locarno	26	10	5	11	41	50	−9	25	
10	Bellinzona	26	10	3	13	49	51	−2	23	
11	FC Bern	26	8	5	13	31	48	−17	21	
12	Cantonal Neuchatel	26	8	5	13	28	53	−25	21	
13	Young Boys	26	6	6	14	44	59	−15	18	Relegated to 1947–48 NLB
14	Urania Genève Sport	26	7	4	15	33	68	−35	18	Relegated to 1947–48 NLB

Source: rsssf.com
Rules for classification: 1) Points; 2) Goal difference within the league, however with play-off for qualifiers;

=== Results ===
Home \ Away	BAS	BEL	BER	BB	CAN	GCZ	GRE	LS	LOC	LUG	SER	UGS	YB	YFZ
Basel		4–1	1–1	1–3	5–1	0–1	1–0	1–1	6–0	1–0	5–1	8–2	8–1	3–2
Bellinzona	4–1		4–0	3–2	8–1	3–0	1–4	0–1	1–1	0–0	0–2	5–0	4–1	2–8
Bern	1–1	0–1		3–3	5–1	1–4	1–0	0–2	2–0	0–1	0–3	3–1	1–2	1–1
Biel-Bienne	1–3	3–0	2–0		5–3	3–2	0–0	5–2	5–1	1–1	2–0	1–0	3–0	5–0
Cantonal Neuchâtel	2–3	2–0	2–0	1–1		0–0	1–0	2–0	0–1	0–0	1–1	0–1	2–0	0–1
Grasshopper Club	4–0	5–0	0–2	1–3	7–0		0–3	3–0	3–2	0–2	3–1	7–0	2–2	5–4
Grenchen	3–1	1–0	5–0	1–1	2–3	2–1		0–2	0–2	1–1	1–0	2–0	2–1	2–2
Lausanne-Sports	7–0	3–2	3–1	1–1	0–0	1–0	2–0		2–1	1–1	0–1	5–2	0–1	2–1
Locarno	0–2	3–1	1–2	2–1	2–0	1–4	2–1	2–0		2–2	0–1	2–0	2–2	2–5
Lugano	2–1	3–1	3–0	2–1	0–1	3–2	0–0	0–1	1–0		5–3	2–2	0–0	1–2
Servette	3–2	2–0	2–3	2–2	3–1	5–1	3–0	0–1	3–3	1–1		2–0	3–7	2–0
Urania	0–0	1–4	3–1	1–1	3–0	0–3	2–1	1–6	3–4	3–0	3–3		4–3	0–2
Young Boys	2–0	1–2	2–2	2–3	3–4	3–2	1–3	0–0	1–3	1–2	3–3	3–0		2–3
Young Fellows	2–2	2–2	0–1	0–2	2–0	1–1	2–2	0–1	2–2	1–1	5–4	0–1	1–0	

Source: rsssf.com
Legend: Blue = home team win; Yellow = draw; Red = away team win.

=== Topscorers ===
Rank	Player	Nat.	Goals	Club
1.	Lauro Amadò	(Switzerland)	19	Grasshopper Club
1.	Hans Blaser	(Switzerland)	19	Young Boys
3.	Alessandro Frigerio	(Switzerland)	17	Bellinzona
4.	Jacques Fatton	(Switzerland)	16	Servette
5.	Jean Tamini	(Switzerland)	15	Servette
6.	Alfred Bickel	(Switzerland)	14	Grasshopper Club
6.	Numa Monnard	(Switzerland)	14	Lausanne-Sport
6.	Josef Righetti	(Switzerland)	14	Grenchen
6.	Arrigo Ruch	(Switzerland)	14	Bellinzona
10.	Traugott Oberer	(Switzerland)	13	Basel
10.	Robert Hasler	(Switzerland)	13	Biel-Bienne
10.	Walter Wälchli	(Switzerland)	13	Young Fellows

== Nationalliga B ==
=== Teams, locations ===
Team	Based in	Canton	Stadium	Capacity
FC Aarau	Aarau	Aargau	Stadion Brügglifeld	9,240
SC Brühl	St. Gallen	St. Gallen	Paul-Grüninger-Stadion	4,200
FC Fribourg	Fribourg	Fribourg	Stade Universitaire	9,000
FC Helvetia Bern	Bern	Bern	Spitalacker, Bern	1,000
CS International Genève	Geneva	Geneva		
FC La Chaux-de-Fonds	La Chaux-de-Fonds	Neuchâtel	Centre Sportif de la Charrière	10,000
FC Luzern	Lucerne	Lucerne	Stadion Allmend	25,000
FC Nordstern Basel	Basel	Basel-Stadt	Rankhof	7,600
FC Red Star Zürich	Zürich	Zürich	Allmend Brunau	2,000
FC Schaffhausen	Schaffhausen	Schaffhausen	Stadion Breite	7,300
FC St. Gallen	St. Gallen	St. Gallen	Espenmoos	11,000
FC Thun	Thun	Bern	Stadion Lachen	10,350
SC Zug	Zug	Zug	Herti Allmend Stadion	6,000
FC Zürich	Zürich	Zürich	Letzigrund	25,000

=== Final league table ===
Pos	Team	Pld	W	D	L	GF	GA	GD	Pts	Qualification or relegation
1	FC Zürich	26	19	3	4	73	27	+46	41	NLB champions and promoted to 1947–48 NLA
2	FC La Chaux-de-Fonds	26	19	2	5	92	33	+59	40	Promoted to 1947–48 NLA
3	FC Aarau	26	15	6	5	50	26	+24	36	
4	FC St. Gallen	26	10	9	7	47	38	+9	29	
5	FC Luzern	26	10	8	8	53	43	+10	28	
6	FC Fribourg	26	10	7	9	37	37	0	27	
7	CS International Genève	26	12	3	11	42	42	0	27	
8	FC Nordstern Basel	26	10	4	12	43	43	0	24	
9	FC Schaffhausen	26	7	9	10	50	70	−20	23	
10	FC Thun	26	9	4	13	33	64	−31	22	
11	SC Brühl	26	8	5	13	39	49	−10	21	
12	SC Zug	26	9	2	15	46	52	−6	20	
13	FC Red Star Zürich	26	7	5	14	33	54	−21	19	Relegated to 1947–48 1. Liga
14	FC Helvetia Bern	26	3	1	22	28	88	−60	7	Relegated to 1947–48 1. Liga

Source: rsssf.com
Rules for classification: 1) Points; 2) Goal difference within the league, however with play-off for qualifiers;

== Further in Swiss football ==
- 1946–47 Swiss Cup
- 1946–47 Swiss 1. Liga

== Sources ==
- Switzerland 1946–47 at RSSSF

Preceded by 1945–46	Nationalliga seasons in Switzerland	Succeeded by 1947–48
