= Siegenthaler =

Siegenthaler is a surname. Notable people with the surname include:

- Bernard Siegenthaler, Swiss sports shooter
- Fritz Siegenthaler (born 1929), Swiss cyclist
- Hans Siegenthaler (1923–2007), Swiss footballer
- John Seigenthaler (1927–2014), American journalist
- John Seigenthaler (anchorman) (born 1955), son of the journalist
- Jonas Siegenthaler (born 1997), Swiss ice hockey player
- Maja Siegenthaler (born 1992), Swiss competitive sailor
- Sina Siegenthaler (born 2000), Swiss snowboarder
- Therese Siegenthaler (1953–1974), Swiss student, one of the victims of the serial killers Fred and Rose West
- Urs Siegenthaler (born 1947), Swiss footballer

== See also ==
- Seigenthaler, surname
