= Seigenthaler =

Seigenthaler is a surname that may refer to:

- John Seigenthaler (1927–2014), an American journalist, writer, and political figure
  - Wikipedia Seigenthaler biography incident, a hoax about the above
- John Seigenthaler (anchorman) (born 1955), an American news anchorman
- Joseph Seigenthaler (born 1959), an American sculptor and video artist

== See also ==
- Siegenthaler, surname
