= 1945–46 Nationalliga A =

Swiss football season

Nationalliga A
- Season: 1945–46
- Champions: Servette
- Relegated: La Chaux-de-Fonds; Zürich
- Top goalscorer: Hans-Peter Friedländer (GC); 25 goals

Nationalliga B
- Season: 1945–46
- Champions: Basel
- Promoted: Basel; Urania Genève Sport
- Relegated: SC Derendingen; Étoile-Sporting

The following is the summary of the Swiss National League in the 1945–46 football season, both Nationalliga A and Nationalliga B. This was the 49th season of top-tier and the 48th season of second-tier football in Switzerland.

== Overview ==
The Swiss Football Association (ASF/SFV) had 28 member clubs at this time and these were divided into two divisions of 14 teams each. The teams played a double round-robin to decide their table positions. Two points were awarded for a win and one point was awarded for a draw. The top tier (NLA) was contested by the top 12 teams from the previous season and the two newly promoted teams FC Locarno and FC Bern. The last two teams in the league table at the end of the season were to be relegated.

The second-tier (NLB) was contested by the two teams that had been relegated from the NLA at the end of the last season, these were FC Basel and FC St. Gallen, the ten teams that had been in third to twelfth position last season and the two newly promoted teams from the 1. Liga FC Schaffhausen and Helvetia Bern. The top two teams at the end of the season would be promoted to the 1946–47 NLA and the two last placed teams would be relegated to the 1946–47 1. Liga.

== Nationalliga A ==
=== Teams, locations ===
Team	Based in	Canton	Stadium	Capacity
AC Bellinzona	Bellinzona	Ticino	Stadio Comunale Bellinzona	5,000
FC Bern	Bern	Bern	Stadion Neufeld	14,000
FC Biel-Bienne	Biel/Bienne	Bern	Stadion Gurzelen	5,500
FC Cantonal Neuchâtel	Neuchâtel	Neuchâtel	Stade de la Maladière	25,500
Grasshopper Club Zürich	Zürich	Zürich	Hardturm	20,000
FC Grenchen	Grenchen	Solothurn	Stadium Brühl	15,100
FC La Chaux-de-Fonds	La Chaux-de-Fonds	Neuchâtel	Centre Sportif de la Charrière	10,000
FC Lausanne-Sport	Lausanne	Vaud	Pontaise	30,000
FC Locarno	Locarno	Ticino	Stadio comunale Lido	5,000
FC Lugano	Lugano	Ticino	Cornaredo Stadium	6,330
Servette FC	Geneva	Geneva	Stade des Charmilles	27,000
BSC Young Boys	Bern	Bern	Wankdorf Stadium	56,000
FC Young Fellows	Zürich	Zürich	Utogrund	2,850
FC Zürich	Zürich	Zürich	Letzigrund	25,000

=== Final league table ===
Pos	Team	Pld	W	D	L	GF	GA	GD	Pts	Qualification or relegation
1	Servette	26	16	4	6	55	33	+22	36	Swiss Champions
2	Lugano	26	12	11	3	40	27	+13	35	
3	Lausanne-Sport	26	12	6	8	53	31	+22	30	
4	Grasshopper Club	26	10	9	7	56	44	+12	29	Swiss Cup winners
5	Biel-Bienne	26	11	6	9	44	46	−2	28	
6	Bellinzona	26	10	6	10	42	36	+6	26	
7	Young Fellows Zürich	26	10	6	10	37	37	0	26	
8	Cantonal Neuchâtel	26	9	7	10	32	35	−3	25	
9	Locarno	26	8	9	9	39	44	−5	25	
10	Bern	26	9	7	10	36	44	−8	25	
11	Grenchen	26	8	7	11	34	34	0	23	
12	Young Boys	26	8	6	12	42	49	−7	22	
13	La Chaux-de-Fonds	26	6	6	14	32	70	−38	18	Relegated to 1946–47 NLB
14	Zürich	26	5	6	15	31	43	−12	16	Relegated to 1946–47 NLB

Source: rsssf.com
Rules for classification: 1) Points; 2) Goal difference within the league, however with play-off for qualifiers;

=== Results ===
Home \ Away	BEL	BER	BB	CAN	CDF	GCZ	GRE	LS	LOC	LUG	SER	YB	YFZ	ZÜR
Bellinzona		2–0	2–0	1–1	7–0	2–3	2–0	0–4	0–0	1–1	2–2	4–0	2–1	1–3
Bern	2–1		0–1	1–0	2–0	5–0	2–1	0–4	2–2	2–2	1–2	2–2	2–4	4–1
Biel-Bienne	1–5	2–0		3–0	2–3	5–0	2–1	2–0	4–2	2–2	0–3	3–1	0–0	2–1
FC Cantonal Neuchâtel	0–1	1–1	3–3		1–0	2–0	2–0	2–1	2–1	1–1	1–3	0–0	3–0	1–3
La Chaux-de-Fonds	4–2	2–3	2–2	2–3		1–1	0–0	0–4	3–1	0–2	0–0	1–1	3–4	2–1
Grasshopper Club	3–0	5–1	9–2	4–2	4–1		1–1	4–0	5–5	0–1	2–2	2–2	2–0	2–1
Grenchen	1–0	1–1	0–2	1–0	7–1	2–1		0–2	7–1	1–1	4–2	0–4	0–1	0–0
Lausanne-Sports	0–0	1–1	4–1	0–0	4–0	2–3	3–0		4–1	1–1	4–2	4–2	2–2	1–0
Locarno	0–0	3–0	1–0	0–2	2–0	0–0	1–1	1–1		0–0	4–0	3–1	2–1	1–0
Lugano	2–0	2–0	1–1	3–1	1–1	2–2	1–0	1–4	3–0		3–2	2–0	0–2	1–1
Servette	3–1	4–1	2–0	1–0	7–0	1–0	2–0	1–0	2–4	3–0		1–0	1–1	3–1
Young Boys	2–4	1–1	1–0	1–3	6–1	2–1	1–2	2–1	2–1	1–2	3–2		2–2	1–3
Young Fellows	3–1	0–1	1–2	3–0	1–2	1–1	0–2	1–0	1–1	1–3	0–1	4–3		2–1
Zürich	0–1	0–1	2–2	1–1	1–3	1–1	2–2	4–2	3–2	0–2	1–3	0–1	0–1	

Source: rsssf.com
Legend: Blue = home team win; Yellow = draw; Red = away team win.

=== Topscorers ===
Rank	Player	Nat.	Goals	Club
1.	Hans-Peter Friedländer	(Switzerland)	25	Grasshopper Club
2.	Amedeo Canetti	(Switzerland)	17	Locarno
3.	Jacques Fatton	(Switzerland)	16	Servette
4.	Numa Monnard	(Switzerland)	15	Lausanne-Sport
5.	Alessandro Frigerio	(Switzerland)	14	Bellinzona
6.	Georges Aeby	(Switzerland)	13	Lausanne-Sport
7.	Nando Albizatti	(Switzerland)	12	Lugano
7.	Robert Hasler	(Switzerland)	12	Biel-Bienne
7.	Josef Righetti	(Switzerland)	12	Grenchen
10.	Demos Rossetti	(Switzerland)	11	Bellinzona
10.	André Belli	(Switzerland)	11	Servette
10.	André Facchinetti	(Switzerland)	11	Servette
10.	Walter Streun	(Switzerland)	11	Young Boys

== Nationalliga B ==
=== Teams, locations ===
Team	Based in	Canton	Stadium	Capacity
FC Aarau	Aarau	Aargau	Stadion Brügglifeld	9,240
FC Basel	Basel	Basel-Stadt	Landhof	4,000
SC Brühl	St. Gallen	St. Gallen	Paul-Grüninger-Stadion	4,200
SC Derendingen	Derendingen	Solothurn	Heidenegg	1,500
FC Étoile-Sporting	La Chaux-de-Fonds	Neuchâtel	Les Foulets / Terrain des Eplatures	1,000 / 500
FC Fribourg	Fribourg	Fribourg	Stade Universitaire	9,000
FC Helvetia Bern	Bern	Bern	Spitalacker, Bern	1,000
CS International Genève	Geneva	Geneva		
FC Luzern	Lucerne	Lucerne	Stadion Allmend	25,000
FC Nordstern Basel	Basel	Basel-Stadt	Rankhof	7,600
FC Schaffhausen	Schaffhausen	Schaffhausen	Stadion Breite	7,300
FC St. Gallen	St. Gallen	St. Gallen	Espenmoos	11,000
Urania Genève Sport	Genève	Geneva	Stade de Frontenex	4,000
SC Zug	Zug	Zug	Herti Allmend Stadion	6,000

=== Final league table ===
Pos	Team	Pld	W	D	L	GF	GA	GD	Pts	Qualification or relegation
1	Basel	26	19	5	2	87	21	+66	43	NLB champions and promoted to 1946–47 NLA
2	Urania Genève Sport	26	17	5	4	53	30	+23	39	Promoted to 1946–47 NLA
3	St. Gallen	26	16	3	7	58	32	+26	35	
4	CS International Genève	26	12	6	8	41	37	+4	30	
5	Aarau	26	10	8	8	46	38	+8	28	
6	Nordstern Basel	26	12	4	10	54	55	−1	28	
7	Fribourg	26	11	5	10	50	53	−3	27	
8	Brühl	26	8	6	12	31	33	−2	22	
9	Luzern	26	8	6	12	44	48	−4	22	
10	Schaffhausen	26	8	6	12	44	50	−6	22	
11	FC Helvetia Bern	26	8	4	14	26	57	−31	20	
12	SC Zug	26	6	6	14	28	63	−35	18	To play-out against relegation
13	SC Derendingen	26	6	6	14	38	53	−15	18	To play-out against relegation
14	Étoile-Sporting	26	2	8	16	27	57	−30	12	Relegated to 1946–47 1. Liga

Source: rsssf.com
Rules for classification: 1) Points; 2) Goal difference within the league, however with play-off for qualifiers;

=== Decider for twelfth place ===
The play-out against relegation was played on 7 July 1946 in Stadion Brügglifeld in Aarau.

Team 1	Score	Team 2
SC Zug	2–1	SC Derendingen

SC Zug won, were placed in twelfth position and remained in the division for the next season. SC Derendingen were classified as thirteenth and thus relegated to the 1946–47 1. Liga.

== Further in Swiss football ==
- 1945–46 Swiss Cup
- 1945–46 Swiss 1. Liga

== Sources ==
- Switzerland 1945–46 at RSSSF

Preceded by 1944–45	Nationalliga seasons in Switzerland	Succeeded by 1946–47
