= Campo Sportivo "Al Vallone" =

Stadium in Biasca, Ticino, Switzerland

Al Vallone
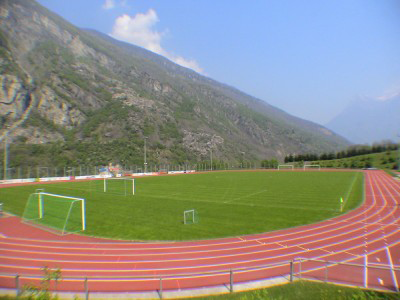
- Interactive map of Al Vallone
- Full name: Campo Sportivo "Al Vallone"
- Location: Biasca
- Coordinates: 46.3728°N 8.9704°E
- Surface: Grass

Tenant
- GC Biaschesi

Campo Sportivo "Al Vallone" is a stadium in Biasca, Ticino, Switzerland. It is currently used for football matches and is the home ground of GC Biaschesi. The current capacity is 2,850. The stadium has 350 seats and 2,500 standing places.
