= Hans Siegenthaler =

Swiss footballer (1923-2007)

Personal information
- Date of birth: 5 February 1923
- Place of birth: Switzerland
- Date of death: 2007 (aged 83–84)
- Place of death: Switzerland
- Height: 1.76 m (5 ft 9 1/2 in)
- Position: Forward

Senior career*
Years	Team	Apps	(Gls)
- SC Young Fellows Juventus

International career
1950	Switzerland	1	(0)
- * Club domestic league appearances and goals

Hans Siegenthaler (5 February 1923 – 2007) was a Swiss football forward who played for Switzerland in the 1950 FIFA World Cup. (Note: "1950 World Cup Brazil - Switzerland". FIFA.) He played 45 minutes of an international friendly against Yugoslavia on 11 June 1950 but was on the bench for their three World Cup games. He also played for SC Young Fellows Juventus beginning in 1943. He retired in 1957 and died in 2007.
