= Traugott Oberer =

Swiss footballer (1924–1974)

Personal information
- Full name: Traugott "Traughi" Oberer
- Date of birth: 30 November 1924
- Place of birth: Switzerland
- Date of death: 19 April 1974 (aged 49)
- Place of death: Basel, Switzerland
- Positions: Midfielder; forward

Senior career*
Years	Team	Apps	(Gls)
1941–1942	Basel	2	(1)
1942–1944	Montreux-Sports		
1944–1948	Basel	91	(41)
1949–1950	Cantonal Neuchâtel	45	(35)
1950–1952	Chiasso	51	(22)
1952–1953	Cantonal	24	(5)
1953–1956	Chiasso	72	(22)
1956–1957	Cantonal	8	(1)

International career
1949–1950	Switzerland	3	(2)

Managerial career
- 1952–1953: Cantonal
- * Club domestic league appearances and goals

Traugott Oberer (30 November 1924 – 19 April 1974) was a Swiss footballer who played as a forward or, in later years, as midfielder during the 1940s and 1950s.

== Club football ==
Oberer started his football with FC Basel and advanced to their first team in their 1941–42 season under Manager Eugen Rupf. After one test match, Oberer played his domestic league debut for the club in the home game at the Landhof on 26 August 1941 as Basel won 5–1 against Concordia Basel. He scored his first league goal for his club one week later on 2 November in the away game against SC Zug. It was the winning goal and Basel won 1–0.

Oberer transferred out and continued his playing career with Montreux-Sports, who played one league lower. He remained with Montreux for two seasons.

For Basel's 1944–45 season Oberer transferred back to his club of origin. But the season ran badly and they were relegated at the end of it. Because they had suffered relegation, the clear aim for the next season was to obtain immediate promotion. Oberer scored five goals in one league match, including three goals in a row in the 70th, 75th and 80 minute, against FC Helvetia Bern on 16 December 1945. Basel won the match 10–0. In the return game in Bern against Helvetia, Oberer scored another hat-trick as Basel won 6–1. This time he achieved three goals in a row in the 77th, 80th and 83rd minute, within six minutes of each other. With his club at the end of their 1945–46 season he gained promotion from the Nationalliga B to the Nationalliga A (now called Swiss Super League). The two youngsters in the team together scored more than half of the team's 87 goals. René Bader was the team's top goal scorer with 27 goals, Oberer was second best scorer with 20 goals.

In Basel's 1946–47 season Oberer won the Swiss Cup with his club. Oberer was the team's top league goal scorer with 13 goals and he achieved two further hat-tricks during that league season. The following season in the cup match on 26 October 1947 against Balerna, Oberer scored his first hat-trick in this competition.

Between the years 1941 to 1942 and again from 1944 to 1948, Oberer played a total of 151 games for Basel scoring a total of 81 goals. 93 of these games were in the Nationalliga A, 17 in the Swiss Cup and 42 were friendly games. He scored 42 goals in the domestic league, 11 in the cup competition and the other 28 were scored during the test games.

In the 1949–50 season he played with Cantonal Neuchâtel (later Xamax) before moving to Chiasso for two years. Again in the 1952–53 season he return to play another year for Cantonal before returning to Chiasso for three further seasons. Oberer ended his playing career after the 1956–57 season, this was his third spell with Cantonal.

== National team ==
Oberer gained three caps for the Swiss national football team. His debut was on 18 September 1949 in the away game against Luxembourg, a 3–2 win, in which he scored a goal. His second game was in the away defeat suffered against Belgium just two weeks later. Oberers third and final national team game was on 19 March 1950 as Switzerland drew 3–3 in the away tie against Austria. In the Praterstadion in front of 62,000 spectators Oberer scored the last goal to secure the draw.

== Personal life ==
Oberer died in Basel, Switzerland on 19 April 1974, at the age of 49.

== Honours and Titles ==
Basel

- Swiss Cup winner: 1946–47
- Promotion to Nationalliga A: 1945–46

== Sources ==
- Die ersten 125 Jahre. Publisher: Josef Zindel im Friedrich Reinhardt Verlag, Basel. ISBN 978-3-7245-2305-5
- Verein "Basler Fussballarchiv" Homepage
- 1946–47 at RSSSF
