= Sportanlagen Trinermatten =

Stadium in Zofingen, Switzerland

Coordinates: 47.277°N 7.941°E

Sportanlagen Trinermatten is a stadium in Zofingen, Canton Aargau, Switzerland. It is currently used for football matches and is the home ground of SC Zofingen. The stadium opened in 1974, and has one covered grandstand with seating for 670.
