= Willy Kernen =

Swiss footballer (1929-2009)

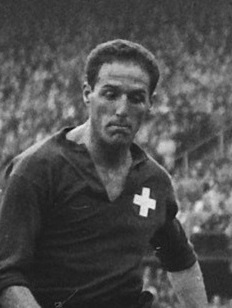

Personal information
- Date of birth: 6 August 1929
- Place of birth: La Chaux-de-Fonds
- Date of death: 12 November 2009 (aged 80)
- Place of death: La Chaux-de-Fonds
- Height: 1.79 m (5 ft 10 in)
- Position: Defender

Senior career*
Years	Team	Apps	(Gls)
1944–1962	FC La Chaux-de-Fonds		

International career
1950–1960	Switzerland	41	(1)
- * Club domestic league appearances and goals

Wilhelm Kernen (6 August 1929 – 12 November 2009) was a Swiss footballer.

He played for FC La Chaux-de-Fonds from 1950 to 1962, winning two Swiss league titles and five Swiss Cups. He also earned 41 caps and scored 1 goal for the Switzerland national football team, and participated in three World Cups.
