= Lauro Amadò =

Swiss footballer (1912-1971)

Personal information
- Date of birth: 3 March 1912
- Place of birth: Lugano, Switzerland
- Date of death: 6 June 1971 (aged 59)
- Position: Striker

Senior career*
Years	Team	Apps	(Gls)
1930–1932	Lugano		
1932–1934	Servette		
1934–1940	Lugano		
1940–1949	Grasshopper Club Zürich		

International career
1935–1948	Switzerland	54	(21)

Managerial career
- 1951: Chiasso
- * Club domestic league appearances and goals

Lauro Amadò (3 March 1912 – 6 June 1971), also known as Lajo, was a Swiss football player.

== Career ==
Amadò was born in Lugano. He played 54 international games for the Switzerland national football team and scored 21 goals. The striker took part in three games at the 1938 FIFA World Cup.

Clubs

- 1930-1932 FC Lugano
- 1932-1934 Servette Genf
- 1934-1940 FC Lugano
- 1940-1949 Grasshopper Club Zürich

Honours

- Swiss League Champion: 1933, 1938, 1942, 1943, 1945
- Swiss Cup: 1931, 1941, 1942, 1943, 1946
- NLA Top scorer: 1943, 1947
