= Jean Tamini =

Swiss footballer (1919-1993)

Personal information
- Date of birth: 9 December 1919
- Place of birth: Switzerland
- Date of death: 13 March 1993 (aged 73)
- Position: Forward

Senior career*
Years	Team	Apps	(Gls)
1939–1940	FC Lyon		
1940–1941	AS Saint-Étienne		
1941–1943	FC Lyon		
1943–1944	Servette FC		
1944–1945	FC Lyon		
1945–1950	Servette FC		
1950–1952	AS Saint-Étienne	34	(12)
1952–1953	Servette FC		

International career
1946–1950	Switzerland	20	(3)
- * Club domestic league appearances and goals

Jean Tamini (9 December 1919 – 13 March 1993) was a Swiss football forward who played for Switzerland in the 1950 FIFA World Cup. He also played for FC Lyon, AS Saint-Étienne, and Servette FC.
