= GC Biaschesi =

Swiss football club

- Full name: Giovani Calciatori Biaschesi
- Founded: 1941
- Ground: Campo Sportivo "Al Vallone", Biasca, Ticino, Switzerland
- Capacity: 2,850 (350 seated
- President: Vinko Curic
- Trainer: Denis Mattiello
- League: Liga. 3
- 2025/2026: 13th
| Home colours | Away colours |

GC Biaschesi is a Swiss football club from the town of Biasca in Canton Ticino, the Italian-speaking region of Switzerland. The team currently plays in Liga 3., the third amateur tier in the Swiss football pyramid. The club narrowly missed out on promotion to the Challenge League after losing a play off match in May 2008, against FC Stade Nyonnais. Finished the 2024/2025 season in 3rd position.

== Stadium ==
GC Biaschesi play their home games at Campo Sportivo "Al Vallone". The total capacity is 2,850. The stadium has 350 seats and 2,500 standing places.
