= FC Black Stars Basel =

Swiss football club

Black Stars Basel
- Full name: Football Club Black Stars Basel
- Founded: 1907; 119 years ago
- Ground: Buschwilerhof; Basel, Switzerland
- Capacity: 1,200
- Chairman: Peter Faé
- Coach: Matthias Maeder
- League: 1. Liga Classic
- 2024–25: Group 2, 4th of 16
- Website: http://www.blackstars.ch/
Home colours	Away colours

FC Black Stars Basel, commonly known as Black Stars Basel is a football club from Basel, Switzerland. They currently play in the 1. Liga Classic, the fourth tier of Swiss football. They were promoted to the third tier in 2019.

== Current squad ==
As of 10 April 2026. Note: Flags indicate national team as defined under FIFA eligibility rules; some limited exceptions apply. Players may hold more than one non-FIFA nationality.

No.	Pos.	Nation	Player
1	GK	SUI	Emre Sahin
4	MF	KOS	Enis Fazlija
5	DF	FRA	Alexandre Edwige (Captain)
6	DF	POR	Ricardo Farinha
7	FW	BIH	Dino Babović
8	MF	SUI	Gabriel Di Noto
9	FW	SUI	Aleksandar Babic
10	MF	ITA	Leonardo Farenga
11	FW	SUI	Ashwin Sivananbu
12	DF	SUI	Kristian Zaric
13	MF	FRA	Leart Shala
14	MF	ESP	Yassine Ascali
15	DF	SUI	Valentin Kaufmann

No.	Pos.	Nation	Player
16	MF	SUI	Leon Shillova
17	MF	TUR	Berkay Isiklar
18	DF	SUI	Emre Ercin
20	DF	GER	Robin Gaida
21	DF	FRA	Gabriele Levante
22	MF	CRO	Georgije Kuzet
24	FW	SUI	Modou Minteh
25	MF	SUI	Luca Mentil
28	MF	KOS	Eron Xheladini
29	MF	GER	Fabio Di Brizzi
40	GK	ALB	Kostandin Pando
98	GK	AUT	Jonas Haider
99	GK	SUI	Loris Reber
