= FC Arbon 05 =

Swiss football club

- Full name: Football Club Arbon 05
- Founded: 1905; 121 years ago
- Ground: Stacherholz
- Capacity: 1,500
- Chairman: Lukas Auer
- Manager: Mischa Schoch
- League: 2. Liga Interregional
- 2024–25: Group 4, 14th of 16

FC Arbon 05 is a Swiss football club from Arbon, canton of Thurgau. The team currently play in the 2. Liga Interregional, the fifth tier of Swiss football.

== History ==
FC Arbon 05 was founded in 1905.

== Staff and board members ==
- President: (Switzerland) Lukas Auer
- Sponsoring: (Switzerland) Genc Zumeri
- Marketing : (Italy) Silvio Tortorelli

- Sportchef: (Switzerland) Tobias Egger
- Finanzen: (Switzerland) Kim Flach
- Junioren: (Switzerland) Rinaldo Zingarelli
