= AC Bellinzona =

Swiss football club

Bellinzona
- Full name: Associazione Calcio Bellinzona
- Nickname: Granata (Maroon)
- Founded: 1904
- Ground: Stadio Comunale Bellinzona, Bellinzona, Switzerland
- Capacity: 5,000 (600 seated)
- Chairman: Paolo Righetti
- Manager: vacant
- League: Swiss Promotion League
- 2025–26: Swiss Challenge League, 10th of 10 (Relegated)
- Website: www.acbellinzona.ch
| Home colours | Away colours | Third colours |

Associazione Calcio Bellinzona is a Swiss football club based in Bellinzona. It was founded in 1904, and won the Swiss Super League in 1948. After being folded in 2013 declaring bankruptcy, the team played the Ticino Group of 2.Liga, the sixth tier of the Swiss Football League System in 2014–15 season. After winning it and the 1. Liga Classic, Bellinzona was promoted to 1. Liga Promotion. They have since earned promotion back to, and currently play in, the Swiss Challenge League, the second tier of Swiss football.

== History ==
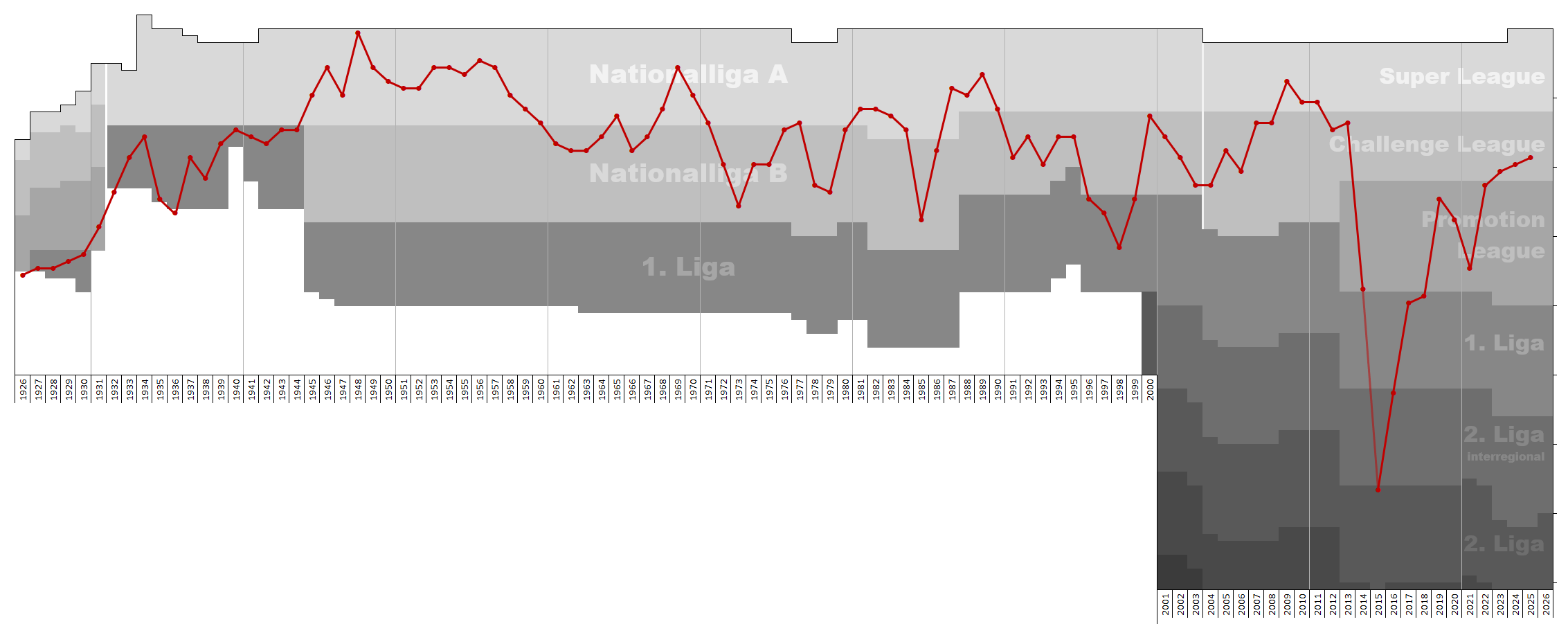
Chart of AC Bellinzona table positions in the Swiss football league system

Because Bellinzona is an Italian-speaking region, many of Italy's Serie A clubs have loaned youth players to the club to get first team experience.

Bellinzona was promoted to the Swiss Super League after beating St. Gallen 5–2 on aggregate in the relegation play-off following the 2007–2008 season. Bellinzona played at the top level in the 2008–2009 season for the first time since the 1989–90 season. As finalists in the Swiss Cup, the team also qualified for the 08-09 UEFA Cup where it beat Ararat Yerevan of Armenia in the 1st qualifying round. Then they knocked-out Ukrainian FC Dnipro on away goal rule (2:3 in Dnipropetrovsk, and 2:1 home victory, 4:4 aggregate). In third qualifying round they faced Galatasaray losing both games 3:4 at home ground and 1:2 in Istanbul.

In 2013 before the 2013–14 season of 1. Liga Promotion the club was declared bankrupt. After staying one season playing only at young divisions, the club went back to professional football, joining the 2014–15 2.Liga. After two years in 1. Liga Classic, the club finished first in 2018 and was promoted to the 1. Liga Promotion for the 2018–19 season.

In the 2021–22 Swiss Promotion League, Bellinzona reached second place during the regular season. In the promotion round, they were able eke out a first-place finish ahead of FC Breitenrain to gain promotion to the Swiss Challenge League. As Breitenrain withdrew their license request, Bellinzona would have been promoted even had they not won the season.

Their return to the Challenge League was a season of ups, such as a 5–1 home victory to FC Wil, and downs, such as a 0–6 home defeat to Stade Lausanne-Ouchy on the last matchday, which saw the team finish in ninth place (out of ten). Following a 3–2 victory against Wil on matchday 33, the team was secured from relegation. Another sign of the unsettled season was the number of changes in the coaching staff. David Sesa, who had joined in the pre-season, resigned after only two months at the helm. Baldassare Raineri took over the team in September, before being terminated in the winter break and his replacement Stefano Maccioppi was terminated at the end of March 2023. Counting interim coach Fernando Cocimano, who took over coaching duties between Sesa and Raineri and again after Maccoppi until the end of the season, the team had four different coaches throughout the season.

== Honours ==
- Swiss Super League
  - Champions: 1947–48
- Swiss Challenge League
  - Champions: 1942–43 (Lost promotion play-off), 1943–44 (Won promotion play-off), 1975–76, 1979–80, 1999–2000 (Lost promotion play-off)
- Swiss Promotion League
  - Champions: 2021–22
- 1. Liga Classic
  - Champions: 1931–32, 1935–36, 1998–99, 2017–18
- 2. Liga
  - Champions: 1920–21 (as 4th tier), 2014–15 (as 6th tier)

== Players ==
=== Current squad ===
As of 20 September 2026

Note: Flags indicate national team as defined under FIFA eligibility rules; some limited exceptions apply. Players may hold more than one non-FIFA nationality.

| No. | Pos. | Nation | Player |
|---|---|---|---|
| 1 | GK | SUI | Ulisse Pelloni |
| 2 | DF | SUI | Jeremy Simeone |
| 3 | DF | ITA | Lorenzo Alizoni |
| 4 | DF | KOS | Arbnor Gecaj |
| 5 | DF | KOS | Dion Dërmaku |
| 6 | DF | SUI | Endrit Fetahu |
| 7 | FW | SUI | Manuel Shkodriqi |
| 8 | MF | ITA | Tommaso Centinaro |
| 10 | MF | SUI | Nusret Salihu |
| 11 | MF | SUI | Besart Shabanaj |
| 12 | GK | SUI | Attilio Morosoli |
| 13 | FW | ARG | Gastón Espósito |
| 14 | DF | SUI | Jenson Bucovaz |
| 15 | MF | SUI | Giona Lombardo |
| 18 | MF | URU | Pablo Ceppelini |
| 19 | FW | ALB | Armando Sadiku |
| 20 | FW | SUI | Martino Novaresi |

| No. | Pos. | Nation | Player |
|---|---|---|---|
| 21 | MF | AUT | Gabriel Zaic |
| 22 | GK | SUI | Elio Trochen |
| 23 | DF | KOS | Sead Ahmeti |
| 26 | FW | SUI | Bamlak Sora |
| 27 | MF | SUI | Alexander Giger |
| 29 | FW | SUI | Yohan Aymon |
| 30 | FW | MKD | Florijan Kadriu |
| 33 | DF | ITA | Angelo Carpani (on loan from Paradiso) |
| 44 | DF | URU | Marcos Paolini |
| 45 | MF | SUI | Brian Sergi |
| 49 | FW | GER | Gabriel Kyeremateng |
| 59 | DF | SUI | Brando Canzian |
| 70 | MF | ITA | Armando Rexhepaj |
| 90 | FW | ITA | Lamine N'Diaye |
| 91 | DF | SUI | Dragan Mihajlović |
| 99 | FW | SUI | Veljko Vukasinovic |

=== Out on loan ===
Note: Flags indicate national team as defined under FIFA eligibility rules; some limited exceptions apply. Players may hold more than one non-FIFA nationality.

| No. | Pos. | Nation | Player |
|---|---|---|---|
| 77 | MF | ITA | Alessandro Grano (at Locarno until 30 June 2027) |

== Coaching staff ==
| Position | Name |
|---|---|
| Head coach | (Italy) Francesco Pargalia |
| Goalkeeper coach | (Switzerland) Pietro Scalesi |
| Physiotherapist | (Switzerland) Luca Moretti |
| Doctor | (Switzerland) Gianluca Baroni |
