= FC Montreux-Sports =

Swiss football club

Montreux-Sports
- Full name: FC Montreux-Sports
- Founded: 1903
- Ground: Stade de Chailly
- Capacity: 300
- League: 2. Liga Interregional
- 2010–11: 3rd

FC Montreux-Sports is a professional football club based in Montreux, Switzerland. They are currently playing in the regional division, the fifth level on the Swiss Football League.

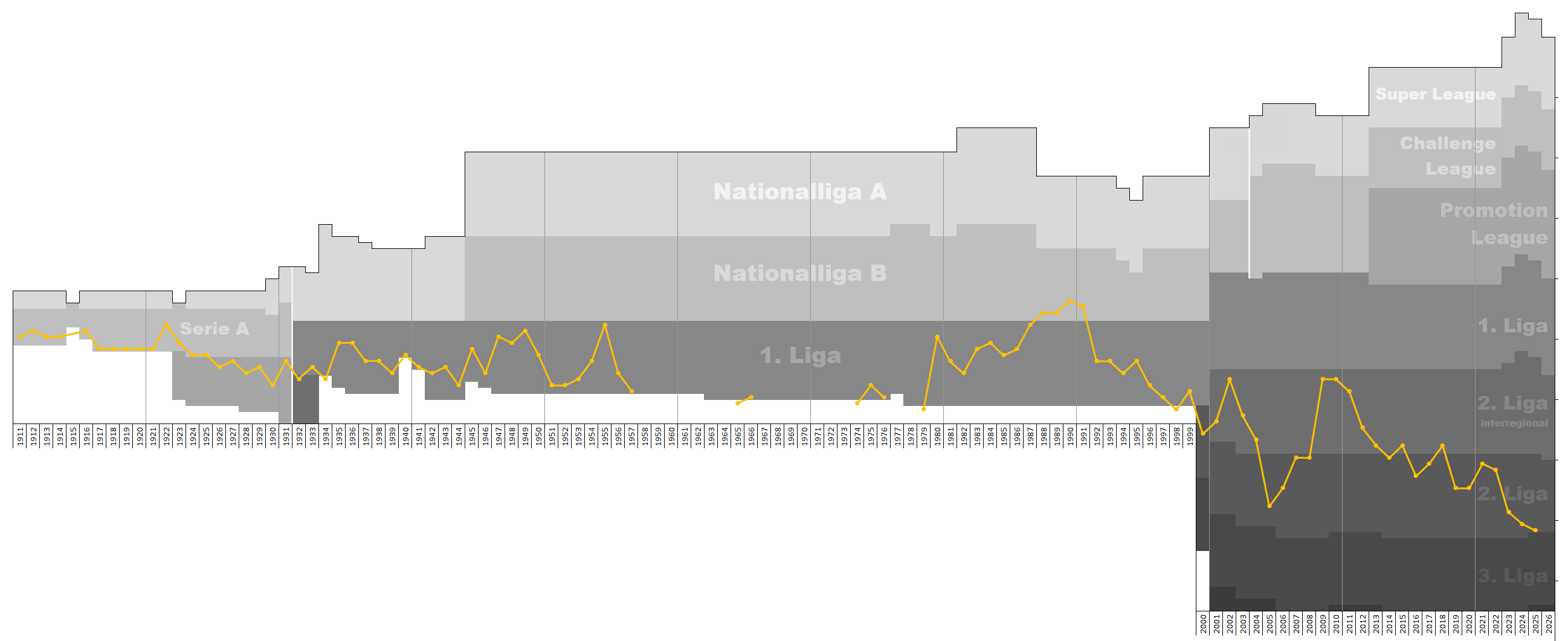
Chart of FC Montreux-Sports table positions in the Swiss football league system
