= List of Swiss football champions =

The following list of Swiss football champions lists all past winners of the top-tier football competitions for clubs in Switzerland. It includes all winners of the present-day Swiss Super League as well as the predecessor leagues played in the country. Swiss champions have been officially determined since the 1898–1899 season.

Key

†	League champions also won the Swiss Cup, i.e. they completed a domestic Double.

== Serie A (1898–1931) ==
Season	Champions (titles)	Runners-up	Third place
1897–98	Grasshopper 1 (unofficial)	—	—
1898–99	Anglo-American Club (1)	—	—
1899–1900	Grasshopper (2)	Bern	—
1900–01	Grasshopper (3)	Bern	—
1901–02	Zürich (1)	Young Boys	Bern
1902–03	Young Boys (1)	Zürich	Neuchâtel
1903–04	St. Gallen (1)	Old Boys	Servette
1904–05	Grasshopper (4)	La Chaux-de-Fonds	Young Boys
1905–06	Winterthur (1)	Servette	Young Boys
1906–07	Servette (1)	Young Fellows	Basel
1907–08	Winterthur (2)	Young Boys	—
1908–09	Young Boys (2)	Winterthur	—
1909–10	Young Boys (3)	Servette	Aarau
1910–11	Young Boys (4)	Zürich	Servette
1911–12	Aarau (1)	Étoile La Chaux-de-Fonds	Servette
1912–13	Montriond Lausanne (1)	Old Boys	Aarau
1913–14	Aarau (2)	Young Boys	Xamax
1914–15	Brühl (1)	Servette	—
1915–16	Xamax (1)	Winterthur	Old Boys
1916–17	Winterthur (3)	La Chaux-de-Fonds	Young Boys
1917–18	Servette (2)	Young Boys	St. Gallen
1918–19	Étoile La Chaux-de-Fonds (1)	Servette	Winterthur
1919–20	Young Boys (5)	Servette	Grasshopper
1920–21	Grasshopper (5)	Young Boys	Servette
1921–22	Servette (3)	Luzern	Blue Stars
1922–23	~~FC Bern~~ (Note: FC Bern were retroactively stripped of the title for fielding an ineligible player.)	Young Fellows	Servette
1923–24	Zürich (2)	Nordstern	Servette
1924–25	Servette (4)	Bern	Young Fellows
1925–26	Servette (5)	Grasshopper	Young Boys
1926–27	Grasshopper (6) †	Nordstern	Biel-Bienne
1927–28	Grasshopper (7)	Nordstern	Étoile Carouge
1928–29	Young Boys (6)	Grasshopper	Urania Genève Sport
1929–30	Servette (6)	Grasshopper	Biel-Bienne
1930–31	Grasshopper (8)	Urania Genève Sport	La Chaux-de-Fonds

== National League (1931–1944) ==
Season	Champions (titles)	Runners-up	Third place	Top scorer(s)		
Season	Champions (titles)	Runners-up	Third place	Player (Club)	Nat.	Goals
1931–32	Lausanne-Sport (2)	Zürich	Grasshopper			
1932–33	Servette (7)	Grasshopper	Young Boys			
1933–34	Servette (8)	Grasshopper	Lugano	Leopold Kielholz (Servette)	SUI	40
1934–35	Lausanne-Sport (3) †	Servette	Lugano	Engelbert Bösch (Bern)	AUT	27
1935–36	Lausanne-Sport (4)	Young Fellows	Grasshopper	Willy Jäggi (Lausanne-Sport)	SUI	27
1936–37	Grasshopper (9) †	Young Boys	Young Fellows	Alessandro Frigerio (Young Fellows)	SUI	23
1937–38	Lugano (1)	Grasshopper	Young Boys	Numa Monnard (Basel)	SUI	20
1938–39	Grasshopper (10)	Grenchen	Lugano	Josef Artimovics (Grenchen)	AUT	15
1939–40	Servette (9)	Grenchen	Grasshopper	Georges Aeby (Servette)	SUI	22
1940–41	Lugano (2)	Young Boys	Servette	Alessandro Frigerio (Lugano)	SUI	26
1941–42	Grasshopper (11) †	Grenchen	Servette	Alessandro Frigerio (Lugano)	SUI	23
1942–43	Grasshopper (12) †	Lugano	Lausanne-Sport	Lauro Amadò (Grasshopper)	SUI	31
1943–44	Lausanne-Sport (5) †	Servette	Lugano	Erich Andres (Young Fellows)	SUI	23

== National League A (1944–2003) ==
Season	Champions (titles)	Runners-up	Third place	Top scorer(s)		
Season	Champions (titles)	Runners-up	Third place	Player (Club)	Nat.	Goals
1944–45	Grasshopper (13)	Lugano	Young Boys	Hans-Peter Friedländer (Grasshopper)	SUI	26
1945–46	Servette (10)	Lugano	Lausanne-Sport	Hans-Peter Friedländer (Grasshopper)	SUI	25
1946–47	Biel-Bienne (1)	Lausanne-Sport	Lugano	Lauro Amadò (Grasshopper) ♦	SUI	19
1946–47	Biel-Bienne (1)	Lausanne-Sport	Lugano	Hans Blaser (Young Boys) ♦	SUI	19
1947–48	Bellinzona (1)	Biel-Bienne	Lausanne-Sport	Josef Righetti (Grenchen)	SUI	26
1948–49	Lugano (3)	Basel	La Chaux-de-Fonds	Jacques Fatton (Servette)	SUI	21
1949–50	Servette (11)	Basel	Lausanne-Sport	Jacques Fatton (Servette)	SUI	32
1950–51	Lausanne-Sport (6)	Chiasso	La Chaux-de-Fonds	Hans-Peter Friedländer (Lausanne-Sport)	SUI	23
1951–52	Grasshopper (14) †	Zürich	Chiasso	Josef Hügi (Basel)	SUI	24
1952–53	Basel (1)	Young Boys	Grasshopper	Josef Hügi (Basel) ♦	SUI	32
1952–53	Basel (1)	Young Boys	Grasshopper	Eugen Meier (Young Boys) ♦	SUI	32
1953–54	La Chaux-de-Fonds (1) †	Grasshopper	Lausanne-Sport	Josef Hügi (Basel)	SUI	29
1954–55	La Chaux-de-Fonds (2) †	Lausanne-Sport	Grasshopper	Marcel Mauron (La Chaux-de-Fonds)	SUI	30
1955–56	Grasshopper (15) †	La Chaux-de-Fonds	Young Boys	Branislav Vukosavljević (Grasshopper)	YUG	33
1956–57	Young Boys (7)	Grasshopper	La Chaux-de-Fonds	Adrien Kauer (La Chaux-de-Fonds)	SUI	29
1957–58	Young Boys (8) †	Grasshopper	Chiasso	Ernst Wechselberger (Young Boys)	GER	22
1958–59	Young Boys (9)	Grenchen	Zürich	Eugen Meier (Young Boys)	SUI	24
1959–60	Young Boys (10)	Biel-Bienne	La Chaux-de-Fonds	Willy Schneider (Young Boys)	SUI	25
1960–61	Servette (12)	Young Boys	Zürich	Giuliano Robbiani (Grasshopper)	SUI	27
1961–62	Servette (13)	Lausanne-Sport	La Chaux-de-Fonds	Jacques Fatton (Servette)	SUI	25
1962–63	Zürich (3)	Lausanne-Sport	La Chaux-de-Fonds	Peter von Burg (Zürich)	SUI	24
1963–64	La Chaux-de-Fonds (3)	Zürich	Grenchen	Michel Desbiolles (Servette)	SUI	23
1964–65	Lausanne-Sport (7)	Young Boys	Servette	Rolf Blättler (Grasshopper) §	SUI	19
1964–65	Lausanne-Sport (7)	Young Boys	Servette	Pierre Kerkhoffs (Lausanne-Sport) §	NED	19
1965–66	Zürich (4) †	Servette	Lausanne-Sport	Rolf Blättler (Grasshopper)	SUI	28
1966–67	Basel (2) †	Zürich	Lugano	Rolf Blättler (Grasshopper)	SUI	24
1967–68	Zürich (5)	Grasshopper	Lugano	Fritz Künzli (Zürich)	SUI	28
1968–69	Basel (3)	Lausanne-Sport	Zürich	Hans-Otto Peters (Biel-Bienne)	GER	24
1969–70	Basel (4)	Lausanne-Sport	Zürich	Fritz Künzli (Zürich)	SUI	19
1970–71	Grasshopper (16)	Basel	Lugano	Walter Müller (Young Boys)	SUI	19
1971–72	Basel (5)	Zürich	Grasshopper	Herbert Dimmeler (Winterthur) §	SUI	17
1971–72	Basel (5)	Zürich	Grasshopper	Bernd Dörfel (Servette) §	GER	17
1972–73	Basel (6)	Grasshopper	Sion	Ottmar Hitzfeld (Basel) §	GER	18
1972–73	Basel (6)	Grasshopper	Sion	Ove Grahn (Lausanne-Sport) §	SWE	18
1973–74	Zürich (6)	Grasshopper	Servette	Daniel Jeandupeux (Zürich)	SUI	22
1974–75	Zürich (7)	Young Boys	Grasshopper	Ilija Katić (Zürich)	YUG	23
1975–76	Zürich (8) †	Servette	Basel	Peter Risi (Zürich)	SUI	33
1976–77	Basel (7)	Servette	Zürich	Franco Cucinotta (Zürich)	ITA	28
1977–78	Grasshopper (17)	Servette	Basel	Fritz Künzli (Lausanne-Sport)	SUI	21
1978–79	Servette (14) †	Zürich	Grasshopper	Peter Risi (Zürich)	SUI	16
1979–80	Basel (8)	Grasshopper	Servette	Claudio Sulser (Grasshopper)	SUI	25
1980–81	Zürich (9)	Grasshopper	Neuchâtel Xamax	Peter Risi (Luzern)	SUI	18
1981–82	Grasshopper (18)	Servette	Zürich	Claudio Sulser (Grasshopper)	SUI	23
1982–83	Grasshopper (19) †	Servette	St. Gallen	Jean-Paul Brigger (Servette)	SUI	23
1983–84	Grasshopper (20)	Servette	Sion	Georges Bregy (Sion)	SUI	21
1984–85	Servette (15)	Aarau	Neuchâtel Xamax	Dominique Cina (Sion)	SUI	24
1985–86	Young Boys (11)	Neuchâtel Xamax	Luzern	Steen Thychosen (Lausanne-Sport)	DEN	21
1986–87	Neuchâtel Xamax (2)	Grasshopper	Sion	John Eriksen (Servette)	DEN	28
1987–88	Neuchâtel Xamax (3)	Servette	Aarau	John Eriksen (Servette)	DEN	36
1988–89	Luzern (1)	Grasshopper	Sion	Karl-Heinz Rummenigge (Servette)	GER	24
1989–90	Grasshopper (21) †	Lausanne-Sport	Neuchâtel Xamax	Iván Zamorano (St. Gallen)	CHI	23
1990–91	Grasshopper (22)	Sion	Neuchâtel Xamax	Dario Zuffi (Young Boys)	SUI	17
1991–92	Sion (1)	Neuchâtel Xamax	Grasshopper	Miklos Molnar (Servette)	DEN	18
1992–93	Aarau (3)	Young Boys	Servette	Sonny Anderson (Servette)	BRA	20
1993–94	Servette (16)	Grasshopper	Sion	Élber (Grasshopper)	BRA	21
1994–95	Grasshopper (23)	Lugano	Neuchâtel Xamax	Petar Aleksandrov (Neuchâtel Xamax)	BUL	24
1995–96	Grasshopper (24)	Sion	Neuchâtel Xamax	Petar Aleksandrov (Luzern) §	BUL	19
1995–96	Grasshopper (24)	Sion	Neuchâtel Xamax	Viorel Moldovan (Neuchâtel Xamax) §	ROM	19
1996–97	Sion (2) †	Neuchâtel Xamax	Grasshopper	Viorel Moldovan (Grasshopper)	ROM	27
1997–98	Grasshopper (25)	Servette	Lausanne-Sport	Shabani Nonda (Zürich)	DRC	24
1998–99	Servette (17)	Grasshopper	Lausanne-Sport	Alexandre Rey (Servette)	SUI	19
1999–2000	St. Gallen (2)	Lausanne-Sport	Basel	Charles Amoah (St. Gallen)	GHA	25
2000–01	Grasshopper (26)	Lugano	St. Gallen	Stéphane Chapuisat (Grasshopper) §	SUI	21
2000–01	Grasshopper (26)	Lugano	St. Gallen	Christian Giménez (Lugano) §	ARG	21
2001–02	Basel (9) †	Grasshopper	Lugano	Christian Giménez (Basel) §	ARG	28
2001–02	Basel (9) †	Grasshopper	Lugano	Richard Núñez (Grasshopper) §	URU	28
2002–03	Grasshopper (27)	Basel	Neuchâtel Xamax	Richard Núñez (Grasshopper)	URU	27

== Super League (2003–present) ==
Season	Recent champions (Super League only)	Runners-up	Third place	Top scorer(s)		
Season	Recent champions (Super League only)	Runners-up	Third place	Player (Club)	Nat.	Goals
2003–04	Basel	Young Boys	Servette	Stéphane Chapuisat (Young Boys)	(Switzerland)	23
2004–05	Basel (2)	Thun	Grasshopper	Christian Giménez (Basel)	(Argentina)	27
2005–06	Zürich	Basel	Young Boys	Alhassane Keita (Zürich)	(Guinea)	20
2006–07	Zürich (2)	Basel	Sion	Mladen Petrić (Basel)	(Croatia)	19
2007–08	Basel (3) †	Young Boys	Zürich	Hakan Yakin (Young Boys)	(Switzerland)	24
2008–09	Zürich (3)	Young Boys	Basel	Seydou Doumbia (Young Boys)	(Ivory Coast)	20
2009–10	Basel (4) †	Young Boys	Grasshopper	Seydou Doumbia (Young Boys)	(Ivory Coast)	30
2010–11	Basel (5)	Zürich	Young Boys	Alexander Frei (Basel)	(Switzerland)	27
2011–12	Basel (6) †	Luzern	Young Boys	Alexander Frei (Basel)	(Switzerland)	23
2012–13	Basel (7)	Grasshopper	St. Gallen	Ezequiel Scarione (St. Gallen)	(Argentina)	21
2013–14	Basel (8)	Grasshopper	Young Boys	Shkëlzen Gashi (Grasshopper)	(Albania)	19
2014–15	Basel (9)	Young Boys	Zürich	Shkëlzen Gashi (Basel)	(Albania)	22
2015–16	Basel (10)	Young Boys	Luzern	Moanes Dabbur (Grasshopper)	(Israel)	19
2016–17	Basel (11) †	Young Boys	Lugano	Seydou Doumbia (Basel)	(Ivory Coast)	20
2017–18	Young Boys	Basel	Luzern	Albian Ajeti (Basel, St. Gallen)	(Switzerland)	17
2018–19	Young Boys (2)	Basel	Lugano	Guillaume Hoarau (Young Boys)	(France)	24
2019–20	Young Boys (3) †	St. Gallen	Basel	Jean-Pierre Nsame (Young Boys)	(Cameroon)	32
2020–21	Young Boys (4)	Basel	Servette	Jean-Pierre Nsame (Young Boys)	(Cameroon)	19
2021–22	Zürich (4)	Basel	Young Boys	Jordan Pefok (Young Boys)	(United States)	22
2022–23	Young Boys (5) †	Servette	Lugano	Jean-Pierre Nsame (Young Boys)	(Cameroon)	21
2023–24	Young Boys (6)	Lugano	Servette	Chadrac Akolo (St. Gallen)	(Democratic Republic of the Congo)	14
2023–24	Young Boys (6)	Lugano	Servette	Kevin Carlos (Yverdon-Sport FC)	(Spain)	14
2023–24	Young Boys (6)	Lugano	Servette	Žan Celar (Lugano)	(Slovenia)	14
2024–25	Basel (12) †	Servette	Young Boys	Xherdan Shaqiri (Basel)	(Switzerland)	18
2025–26	Thun	St. Gallen	Lugano	Christian Fassnacht (Young Boys)	(Switzerland)	18

== Records ==
=== By club ===
Rank	Club	Titles	Winning years
1	Grasshopper	27	(1898), 1900, 1901, 1905, 1921, 1927, 1928, 1931, 1937, 1939, 1942, 1943, 1945, 1952, 1956, 1971, 1978, 1982, 1983, 1984, 1990, 1991, 1995, 1996, 1998, 2001, 2003
2	Basel	21	1953, 1967, 1969, 1970, 1972, 1973, 1977, 1980, 2002, 2004, 2005, 2008, 2010, 2011, 2012, 2013, 2014, 2015, 2016, 2017, 2025
3	Servette	17	1907, 1918, 1922, 1925, 1926, 1930, 1933, 1934, 1940, 1946, 1950, 1961, 1962, 1979, 1985, 1994, 1999
3	Young Boys	17	1903, 1909, 1910, 1911, 1920, 1929, 1957, 1958, 1959, 1960, 1986, 2018, 2019, 2020, 2021, 2023, 2024
5	Zürich	13	1902, 1924, 1963, 1966, 1968, 1974, 1975, 1976, 1981, 2006, 2007, 2009, 2022
6	Lausanne-Sport	7	1913, 1932, 1935, 1936, 1944, 1951, 1965
7	Winterthur	3	1906, 1908, 1917
7	Lugano	3	1938, 1941, 1949
7	La Chaux-de-Fonds	3	1954, 1955, 1964
7	Aarau	3	1912, 1914, 1993
11	Neuchâtel Xamax	2	1987, 1988
11	Sion	2	1992, 1997
11	St. Gallen	2	1904, 2000
14	Anglo-American Club Zürich	1	1899
14	Brühl	1	1915
14	Cantonal Neuchâtel	1	1916
14	Etoile-Sporting	1	1919
14	Biel-Bienne	1	1947
14	Bellinzona	1	1948
14	Luzern	1	1989
14	Thun	1	2026

Titles won by club (%)
1. Grasshopper – 27 (21.1%)
2. Basel – 21 (16.4%)
3. Servette – 17 (13.3%)
4. Young Boys – 17 (13.3%)
5. Zürich – 13 (10.2%)
6. Lausanne-Sport – 7 (5.47%)
7. Other clubs – 26 (20.3%)

=== By canton ===
Rank	Canton	Titles	Winning club(s) (titles)
1	Zürich	44	Grasshopper (27), Zürich (13), Winterthur (3), Anglo-American Club (1)
2	Basel-Stadt	21	Basel (21)
3	Bern	19	Young Boys (17), Biel-Bienne (1), Thun (1)
4	Geneva	17	Servette (17)
5	Vaud	7	Lausanne-Sport (7)
5	Neuchâtel	7	La Chaux-de-Fonds (3), Neuchâtel Xamax (2), Cantonal (1), Etoile-Sporting (1)
7	Ticino	4	Lugano (3), Bellinzona (1)
8	Aargau	3	Aarau (3)
8	St. Gallen	3	St. Gallen (2), Brühl (1)
10	Valais	2	Sion (2)
11	Lucerne	1	Luzern (1)

== See also ==
- Football in Switzerland
