= Lamanna =

Lamanna (also spelled LaManna) is an Italian surname. Notable people with the surname include:

- César Lamanna (born 1987), Argentine footballer
- Eugenio Lamanna (born 1989), Italian footballer
- Franco Lamanna (born 1991), Uruguayan rugby union player
- Girolamo Lamanna (1580–1640), Italian painter
- Hugo Lamanna (1913–1991), Argentine footballer and manager
- Matt Lamanna, American paleontologist
- Ross LaManna, American screenwriter and author
- Janine LaManna (born 1966), American actress, voice actress and singer
- Santiago Lamanna (born 1992), Uruguayan footballer
- Stefan Lamanna (born 1995), Canadian soccer player
