= 1941–42 Swiss 1. Liga =

1. Liga
- Season: 1941–42
- Champions: 1. Liga champions: Basel; Group West: Bern; Group East: Basel
- Promoted: Basel
- Relegated: Group West: Forward Morges; Group East: Schaffhausen; Juventus Zürich
- Matches: 156 (West), 132 (East) plus 2 play-offs and 3 play-outs

The 1941–42 1. Liga season was the 10th season of the 1. Liga since its creation in 1931. At this time, the 1. Liga was the second-tier of the Swiss football league system.

== Overview ==
=== Preamble ===
In Switzerland during the second world war period, sport became an integral part of the "spiritual national defense". This was a political and cultural movement that had already become increasingly important during the late 1930s. Politicians, intellectuals and media professionals had increasingly called for measures to strengthen Switzerland's basic cultural values. Since the Nationalliga games were also considered to be one of the activities that seemed important for maintaining the morale of the population, the military authorities put considerably fewer obstacles in the way of the top players and leading clubs as they had during the previous World War. However, in 1941, the "Lex Zumbühl", named after the Swiss Football Association (ASF/SFV) president, formally banned professional football players. In addition to this, the number of foreign players allowed to play was reduced from three to one per team.

=== Format ===
There were new 25 clubs competing in the 1. Liga this season, one more than previously. This season saw the teams divided into just two regional groups as opposed to three groups in previous seasons. The eastern group had 12 teams, the western group had 13 teams. Within each group, the teams would play a double round-robin to decide their league position. Two points were awarded for a win and one point was awarded for a draw. The two group winners then contested a play-off to decide the 1. Liga championship and promotion to the top-tier Nationalliga. The last placed team in each group were directly relegated to the 2. Liga (third tier) and the two second last teams played a play-out against the third and final relegation slot.

== Group West ==
=== Teams, locations ===
| Club | Based in | Canton | Stadium | Capacity |
|---|---|---|---|---|
| FC Bern | Bern | Bern | Stadion Neufeld | 14,000 |
| US Bienne-Boujean | Biel/Bienne | Bern | | |
| CA Genève | Geneva | Geneva | | |
| SC Derendingen | Derendingen | Solothurn | Heidenegg | 1,500 |
| Dopolavoro Genève | Genève | Geneva | | |
| FC Étoile-Sporting | La Chaux-de-Fonds | Neuchâtel | Les Foulets / Terrain des Eplatures | 1,000 / 500 |
| FC Fribourg | Fribourg | Fribourg | Stade Universitaire | 9,000 |
| FC Monthey | Monthey | Valais | Stade Philippe Pottier | 1,800 |
| FC Montreux-Sports | Montreux | Vaud | Stade de Chailly | 1,000 |
| FC Forward Morges | Morges | Vaud | Parc des Sports | 600 |
| FC Solothurn | Solothurn | Solothurn | Stadion FC Solothurn | 6,750 |
| Urania Genève Sport | Genève | Geneva | Stade de Frontenex | 4,000 |
| Vevey Sports | Vevey | Vaud | Stade de Copet | 4,000 |

=== Final league table ===
| Pos | Team | Pld | W | D | L | GF | GA | GD | Pts | Qualification or relegation |
|---|---|---|---|---|---|---|---|---|---|---|
| 1 | Bern | 24 | 19 | 1 | 4 | 60 | 30 | +30 | 39 | To promotion play-off |
| 2 | Urania Genève Sport | 24 | 18 | 2 | 4 | 57 | 24 | +33 | 38 | |
| 3 | Étoile-Sporting | 24 | 12 | 4 | 8 | 60 | 39 | +21 | 28 | |
| 4 | Fribourg | 24 | 11 | 4 | 9 | 51 | 36 | +15 | 26 | |
| 5 | US Bienne-Boujean | 24 | 11 | 4 | 9 | 53 | 43 | +10 | 26 | |
| 6 | SC Derendingen | 24 | 10 | 6 | 8 | 54 | 42 | +12 | 26 | |
| 7 | Solothurn | 24 | 9 | 4 | 11 | 38 | 56 | −18 | 22 | |
| 8 | CA Genève | 24 | 9 | 3 | 12 | 57 | 53 | +4 | 21 | |
| 9 | Montreux-Sports | 24 | 6 | 6 | 12 | 43 | 55 | −12 | 18 | |
| 10 | Monthey | 24 | 6 | 6 | 12 | 41 | 62 | −21 | 18 | |
| 11 | Vevey Sports | 24 | 8 | 2 | 14 | 42 | 67 | −25 | 18 | |
| 12 | Dopolavoro Genève | 24 | 7 | 3 | 14 | 30 | 59 | −29 | 17 | Play-out against relegation |
| 13 | FC Forward Morges | 24 | 5 | 5 | 14 | 37 | 57 | −20 | 15 | Relegation to 2. Liga |

Source: RSSSF
Rules for classification: 1) Points; 2) Goal difference within the league, but decider play-off for qualifiers.

== Group East ==
=== Teams, locations ===
| Club | Based in | Canton | Stadium | Capacity |
|---|---|---|---|---|
| FC Aarau | Aarau | Aargau | Stadion Brügglifeld | 9,240 |
| FC Basel | Basel | Basel-Stadt | Landhof | 4,000/7,000 |
| AC Bellinzona | Bellinzona | Ticino | Stadio Comunale Bellinzona | 5,000 |
| FC Birsfelden | Birsfelden | Basel-Landschaft | Sternenfeld | 9,400 |
| FC Blue Stars Zürich | Zürich | Zürich | Hardhof | 1,000 |
| SC Brühl | St. Gallen | St. Gallen | Paul-Grüninger-Stadion | 4,200 |
| FC Chiasso | Chiasso | Ticino | Stadio Comunale Riva IV | 4,000 |
| FC Concordia Basel | Basel | Basel-Stadt | Stadion Rankhof | 7,000 |
| SC Juventus Zürich | Zürich | Zürich | Utogrund | 2,850 |
| FC Locarno | Locarno | Ticino | Stadio comunale Lido | 5,000 |
| FC Schaffhausen | Schaffhausen | Schaffhausen | Stadion Breite | 7,300 |
| SC Zug | Zug | Zug | Herti Allmend Stadion | 6,000 |

=== Final league table ===
| Pos | Team | Pld | W | D | L | GF | GA | GD | Pts | Qualification or relegation |
|---|---|---|---|---|---|---|---|---|---|---|
| 1 | Basel | 22 | 18 | 3 | 1 | 77 | 15 | +62 | 39 | To promotion play-off |
| 2 | Blue Stars Zürich | 22 | 15 | 4 | 3 | 50 | 25 | +25 | 34 | |
| 3 | Bellinzona | 22 | 10 | 4 | 8 | 46 | 42 | +4 | 24 | |
| 4 | FC Birsfelden | 22 | 10 | 4 | 8 | 34 | 33 | +1 | 24 | |
| 5 | Brühl St. Gallen | 22 | 9 | 6 | 7 | 40 | 37 | +3 | 24 | |
| 6 | SC Zug | 22 | 9 | 6 | 7 | 38 | 37 | +1 | 24 | |
| 7 | Locarno | 22 | 9 | 1 | 12 | 52 | 45 | +7 | 19 | |
| 8 | Chiasso | 22 | 8 | 3 | 11 | 41 | 45 | −4 | 19 | |
| 9 | Aarau | 22 | 7 | 5 | 10 | 34 | 45 | −11 | 19 | |
| 10 | Concordia Basel | 22 | 5 | 7 | 10 | 30 | 44 | −14 | 17 | |
| 11 | Schaffhausen | 22 | 3 | 6 | 13 | 29 | 64 | −35 | 12 | Play-out against relegation |
| 12 | SC Juventus Zürich | 22 | 4 | 1 | 17 | 34 | 73 | −39 | 9 | Relegation to 2. Liga |

Source: RSSSF
Rules for classification: 1) Points; 2) Goal difference within the league, but decider play-off for qualifiers.

== Promotion, relegation ==
=== Promotion play-off ===
The two group winners played a two legged tie for the title of 1. Liga champions and for promotion to the 1942–43 Nationalliga. The games were played 21 and 28 June 1942.

21 June 1942
First leg

| Bern | 0–0 | Basel |
|---|---|---|
| | Summary |

Stadion Neufeld
Attendance: 7,000
Referee: (Switzerland) Joseph Schürch Winterthur

28 June 1942
18:00
Return leg

| Basel | 3–1 | Bern |
|---|---|---|
| Kappenberger 17' (1:0); Suter 27' (2:0); Schmidlin (I) 62' (3:0) | Summary | 80' (3:1) Liechti |

Landhof, Basel
Attendance: 7,000
Referee: (Switzerland) Joseph Schürch Winterthur

Basel won the championship title and were promoted to the top-tier. Bern remained in the division for the next season.

=== Relegation play-out ===
The two second last placed teams from each group played a two legged tie to decide the third and last relegation slot. The games were played on 12 and 19 July 1942.

| Team 1 | Score | Team 2 |
|---|---|---|
| Schaffhausen | 2–3 | Dopolavoro Genève |
| Dopolavoro Genève | 1–1 | Schaffhausen |

The game was nullified due to an ineligible player in the Dopolavoro team. The game was not awarded 0-3 (forfeit) but replayed on 26 July.

| Team 1 | Score | Team 2 |
|---|---|---|
| Dopolavoro Genève | 0–0 | Schaffhausen |

Dopolavoro won and remained in the division for the next season. Schaffhausen were relegated to 2. Liga.

== Further in Swiss football ==
- 1941–42 Nationalliga
- 1941–42 Swiss Cup
- 1941–42 FC Basel season

== Sources ==
- Switzerland 1941–42 at RSSSF

| Preceded by 1940–41 | Seasons in Swiss 1. Liga | Succeeded by 1942–43 |
