= 1942–43 BSC Young Boys season =

BSC Young Boys
1942–43 season
- Chairman: Herrmann Wirth
- Manager: Béla Volentik
- Stadium: Stadion Wankdorf
- Nationalliga: 4th
- Swiss Cup: Quarter-finals

The 1942–43 season was the 44th season in the history of Berner Sport Club Young Boys. The team played their home games at Stadion Wankdorf in Bern.

== Overview ==
Young Boys achieved a fourth place finish in the Nationalliga and reached the quarter-finals of the Swiss Cup where they lost to FC Locarno.

== Players ==
- Maurice Glur
- Achille Siegrist
- Louis Gobet
- Hans Flühmann
- Hans Liniger
- Ernst Siegenthaler
- Willy Terretaz
- Bernard Lanz
- Hans Blaser
- Willy Bernhard
- Ramseyer

== Competitions ==
=== Overall record ===
Competition	First match	Last match	Starting round	Final position	Record							
Competition	First match	Last match	Starting round	Final position	Pld	W	D	L	GF	GA	GD	Win %
Nationalliga	6 September 1942	27 June 1943	Matchday 1	4th	26	12	7	7	46	33	+13	46.15
Swiss Cup	10 January 1943	28 February 1943	Round of 32	Quarter-finals	4	2	1	1	7	8	−1	50.00
Total					30	14	8	8	53	41	+12	46.67

Source: Competitions

=== Nationalliga ===
==== League table ====
Pos	Team	Pld	W	D	L	GF	GA	GD	Pts
2	Lugano	26	15	5	6	67	33	+34	35
3	Lausanne-Sport	26	15	4	7	45	36	+9	34
4	Young Boys	26	12	7	7	46	33	+13	31
5	Cantonal Neuchâtel	26	13	2	11	50	45	+5	28
6	Servette	26	12	3	11	59	44	+15	27

Source: rsssf.com
Rules for classification: 1) Points; 2) Goal difference within the league, however with play-off for qualifiers;

==== Matches ====
6 September 1942 Round 1	Servette	2–3	Young Boys	Geneva
	Marc Perroud 15', 35'		Willy Bernhard 1', 87'; Hans Stegmeier 30'	Stadium: Charmilles Stadium; Attendance: 2,800; Referee: (Switzerland) Joseph Schürch

13 September 1942 Round 2	Young Boys	6–0	St. Gallen	Bern
				Stadium: Stadion Wankdorf; Attendance: 1,800; Referee: (Switzerland) Hans Vogt

27 September 1942 Round 3	Grasshopper Club Zürich	4–0	Young Boys	Zürich
				Stadium: Hardturm; Attendance: 3,500; Referee: (Switzerland) Angelo Scanferla

4 October 1942 Round 4	Young Boys	4–0	Basel	Wankdorf Stadium, Bern
15:00	Bernhard (II) 7' (1:0); Bernhard (II) 21' (2:0); Bernhard (II) 66' (3:0); Stegmeier 71' (4:0)	Summary		Attendance: 8,000; Referee: (Switzerland) Sally Rosenbaum Zürich/St. Gallen

11 October 1942 Round 5	FC Biel-Bienne	1–1	Young Boys	Biel/Bienne
				Stadium: Stadion Gurzelen; Attendance: 2,000; Referee: (Switzerland) Jean Lutz

25 October 1942 Round 6	FC Lausanne-Sport	0–0	Young Boys	Lausanne
				Stadium: Stade de la Pontaise; Attendance: 3,000; Referee: (Switzerland) Adrien Sandoz

8 November 1942 Round 7	Young Boys	2–1	Cantonal Neuchâtel	Bern
				Stadium: Stadion Wankdorf; Attendance: 3,000; Referee: (Switzerland) A. Traub

22 November 1942 Round 8	Lugano	2–0	Young Boys	Lugano
				Stadium: Campo Marzio; Attendance: 2,500; Referee: (Switzerland) Rafaele Pusterla

29 November 1942 Round 9	Young Boys	1–1	Young Fellows Zürich	Bern
				Stadium: Stadion Wankdorf; Attendance: 2,000; Referee: (Switzerland) Walter Häring

6 December 1942 Round 10	Young Boys	2–0	FC Nordstern Basel	Bern
				Stadium: Stadion Wankdorf; Attendance: 2,000; Referee: (Switzerland) Jean Lutz

13 December 1942 Round 11	Grenchen	1–1	Young Boys	Grenchen
				Stadium: Stadion Brühl; Attendance: 1,500; Referee: (Switzerland) Rosenbaum

20 December 1942 Round 12	Luzern	0–1	Young Boys	Lucerne
				Stadium: Stadion Allmend; Attendance: 3,200; Referee: (Switzerland) Eggmann

27 December 1942 Round 13	Young Boys	0–2	Zürich	Bern
				Stadium: Stadion Wankdorf; Attendance: 1,800; Referee: (Switzerland) Rodolphe Wittwer

21 February 1943 Round 15	St. Gallen	2–1	Young Boys	St. Gallen
				Stadium: Espenmoos; Attendance: 1,500; Referee: (Switzerland) Walter Häring

7 March 1943 Round 16	Young Boys	1–4	Grasshopper Club Zürich	Bern
				Stadium: Stadion Wankdorf; Attendance: 3,500; Referee: (Switzerland) Mario Grassi

14 March 1943 Round 17	Basel	1–1	Young Boys	Landhof, Basel
15:00	Suter 38' (1:0)	Summary	55' (1:1) Blaser	Attendance: 3,800; Referee: (Switzerland) Eggmann Zürich

21 March 1943 Round 18	Young Boys	2–0	FC Biel-Bienne	Bern
				Stadium: Stadion Wankdorf; Attendance: 2,500; Referee: (Switzerland) Rafaele Pusterla

11 April 1943 Round 19	Young Boys	2–0	FC Lausanne-Sport	Bern
				Stadium: Stadion Wankdorf; Attendance: 3,000; Referee: (Switzerland) Joseph Schürch

18 April 1943 Round 20	Cantonal Neuchâtel	3–2	Young Boys	Neuchâtel
				Stadium: Stade de la Maladière; Attendance: 3,000; Referee: (Switzerland) Ernst Dörflinger

2 May 1943 Round 21	Young Boys	0–0	Lugano	Bern
				Stadium: Stadion Wankdorf; Attendance: 2,500; Referee: (Switzerland) Hans Vogt

9 May 1943 Round 22	Young Fellows Zürich	1–1	Young Boys	Zürich
				Stadium: Letzigrund; Attendance: 4,500; Referee: (Switzerland) Mario Grassi

30 May 1943 Round 24	Young Boys	3–1	Grenchen	Bern
				Stadium: Stadion Wankdorf; Attendance: 1,500; Referee: (Switzerland) A. Traub

6 June 1943 Round 25	Young Boys	4–0	Luzern	Bern
				Stadium: Stadion Wankdorf; Attendance: 2,000; Referee: (Switzerland) Walter Häring

13 June 1943 Round 23	FC Nordstern Basel	1–3	Young Boys	Basel
				Stadium: Stadion Rankhof; Attendance: 1,500; Referee: (Switzerland) Joseph Schürch

20 June 1943 Round 26	Zürich	3–1	Young Boys	Zürich
				Stadium: Letzigrund; Attendance: 1,000; Referee: (Switzerland) Hans Vogt

27 June 1943 Round 14	Young Boys	4–3	Servette	Bern
				Stadium: Stadion Wankdorf; Attendance: 1,000; Referee: (Switzerland) Ernst Dörflinger

=== Swiss Cup ===
3 January 1943 Round of 32	Aarau	Postponed	Young Boys	Aarau
				Stadium: Stadion Brügglifeld

10 January 1943 Round of 32	Aarau	2–2 (a.e.t.)	Young Boys	Aarau
				Stadium: Stadion Brügglifeld

17 January 1943 Round of 32 replay	Young Boys	3–1	Aarau	Bern
				Stadium: Stadion Warnkof

31 January 1943 Round of 16	St. Gallen	0–2	Young Boys	St. Gallen
				Stadium: Espenmoos

28 February 1943 Quarter-finals	Young Boys	0–5	Locarno	Bern
				Stadium: Stadion Wankdorf
