= 1941–42 BSC Young Boys season =

BSC Young Boys
1941–42 season
- Chairman: Eduard Studer
- Manager: Hans Pulver
- Stadium: Stadion Wankdorf
- Nationalliga: 9th
- Swiss Cup: Round 4

The 1941–42 season was the 43rd season in the history of Berner Sport Club Young Boys. The team played their home games at Stadion Wankdorf in Bern.

== Overview ==
Young Boys achieved a ninth-place finish and reached the fourth round of the Swiss Cup where they lost to eventual finals runner-up FC Basel.

== Players ==
- Maurice Glur
- Achille Siegrist
- Louis Gobet
- Otto Hänni
- Hans Liniger
- Hans Trachsel
- Hans Stegmeier
- Hans Blaser
- Willy Bernhard
- Willy Terretaz
- Gerber

== Competitions ==
=== Overall record ===
Competition	First match	Last match	Starting round	Final position	Record							
Competition	First match	Last match	Starting round	Final position	Pld	W	D	L	GF	GA	GD	Win %
Nationalliga	31 August 1941	12 July 1942	Matchday 1	9th	26	7	9	10	38	41	−3	26.92
Swiss Cup	21 December 1941		Round 4	Round 4	1	0	0	1	0	3	−3	0.00
Total					27	7	9	11	38	44	−6	25.93

Source: Competitions

=== Nationalliga ===
==== Matches ====
31 August 1941 1	Young Boys	2–2	Grasshopper Club Zürich	Bern
	Hermann Läderach 40'; Willy Bernhard 60'		H. Bianchi 8'; Wilhelm Neukom 9'	Stadium: Stadion Wankdorf; Attendance: 3,500; Referee: Jean Lutz

7 September 1941 2	Young Fellows Zürich	1–0	Young Boys	Zürich
	Montorfani 81'			Stadium: Letzigrund; Attendance: 5,500; Referee: Mario Grassi

14 September 1941 3	Young Boys	2–0	Grenchen	Bern
	Hermann Läderach 27'; Otto Hänni 70'			Stadium: Stadion Wankdorf; Attendance: 3,000; Referee: Joseph Schürch

28 September 1941 4	FC La Chaux-de-Fonds	0–1	Young Boys	La Chaux-de-Fonds
			Willy Bernhard 42'	Stadium: Centre Sportif de la Charrière; Attendance: 1,500; Referee: Felix Herren

12 October 1941 5	Young Boys	3–2	FC Nordstern Basel	Bern
				Stadium: Stadion Wankdorf; Attendance: 2,000; Referee: Adrien Sandoz

26 October 1941 7	Young Boys	1–2	Zürich	Bern
				Stadium: Stadion Wankdorf; Attendance: 3,000; Referee: Hans Vogt

2 November 1941 8	St. Gallen	2–1	Young Boys	St. Gallen
				Stadium: Espenmoos; Attendance: 1,500; Referee: Mario Grassi

9 November 1941 9	Young Boys	1–1	FC Biel-Bienne	Bern
				Stadium: Stadion Wankdorf; Attendance: 2,000; Referee: Rodolphe Wittwer

23 November 1941 11	Young Boys	1–1	Servette	Bern
				Stadium: Stadion Wankdorf; Attendance: 4,000; Referee: Massa

30 November 1941 12	Young Boys	1–0	FC Lausanne-Sport	Bern
				Stadium: Stadion Wankdorf; Attendance: 3,000; Referee: Mario Grassi

7 December 1941 13	Lugano	1–1	Young Boys	Lugano
				Stadium: Campo Marzio; Attendance: 2,500; Referee: Joseph Schürch

14 December 1941 10	Cantonal Neuchâtel	1–2	Young Boys	Neuchâtel
				Stadium: Stade de la Maladière; Attendance: 3,500; Referee: Hans Vogt

12 April 1942 15	Young Boys	1–1	Young Fellows Zürich	Bern
				Stadium: Stadion Wankdorf; Attendance: 3,500; Referee: William Bangerter

19 April 1942 16	Grenchen	2–0	Young Boys	Grenchen
				Stadium: Stadion Brühl; Attendance: 2,000; Referee: Hans Vogt

26 April 1942 17	Young Boys	2–1	FC La Chaux-de-Fonds	Bern
				Stadium: Stadion Wankdorf; Attendance: 2,000; Referee: Joseph Schürch

3 May 1942 18	FC Nordstern Basel	1–1	Young Boys	Basel
				Stadium: Stadion Rankhof; Attendance: 2,000; Referee: Jean Lutz

10 May 1942 19	Young Boys	2–1	Luzern	Bern
				Stadium: Stadion Wankdorf; Attendance: 1,800; Referee: Mario Grassi

14 May 1942 20	Zürich	5–3	Young Boys	Zürich
				Stadium: Letzigrund; Attendance: 3,000; Referee: Hans Vogt

17 May 1942 21	Young Boys	2–3	St. Gallen	Bern
				Stadium: Stadion Wankdorf; Attendance: 2,500; Referee: Eggmann

31 May 1942 22	FC Biel-Bienne	3–2	Young Boys	Biel/Bienne
				Stadium: Stadion Gurzelen; Attendance: 1,000; Referee: Jean Lutz

7 June 1942 23	Young Boys	3–1	Cantonal Neuchâtel	Bern
				Stadium: Stadion Wankdorf; Attendance: 1,000; Referee: Rafaele Pusterla

14 June 1942 24	Servette	1–0	Young Boys	Geneva
				Stadium: Charmilles Stadium; Attendance: 4,000; Referee: Hans Vogt

20 June 1942 25	FC Lausanne-Sport	4–3	Young Boys	Lausanne
				Stadium: Stade olympique de la Pontaise; Attendance: 2,000; Referee: Walter Häring

27 June 1942 26	Young Boys	2–3	Lugano	Bern
	Hans Trachsel 40'; Willy Bernhard 50'		Alessandro Frigerio 52', 57'; Mario Fornara 70'	Stadium: Stadion Wankdorf; Attendance: 1,500; Referee: Roger Rapin

5 July 1942 14	Grasshopper Club Zürich	1–1	Young Boys	Zürich
				Stadium: Hardturm; Attendance: 2,000; Referee: Jean Lutz

12 July 1942 6	Luzern	1–1	Young Boys	Lucerne
				Stadium: Stadion Allmend; Attendance: 800; Referee: Joseph Schürch

=== Swiss Cup ===
21 December 1941 Round 4	Basel	3–0	Young Boys	Basel
14:30	Suter 13'; Kappenberger 39'; Rupf 50'			Stadium: Landhof; Attendance: 4,000; Referee: W. Bangerter
