= 1942–43 Swiss Cup =

Tournament details
- Country: Switzerland

Final positions
- Champions: Grasshopper Club
- Runners-up: Lugano

The 1942–43 Swiss Cup was the 18th season of Switzerland's football cup competition, organised annually since the 1925–26 season by the Swiss Football Association.

== Overview ==
=== Preamble ===
In Switzerland during the second world war, sport became an integral part of the "spiritual national defense". This was a political and cultural movement that had already become increasingly important during the late 1930s. Politicians, intellectuals and media professionals had increasingly called for measures to strengthen Switzerland's basic cultural values. As football games were also considered to be one of the activities that seemed important for maintaining the morale of the population, the military authorities put considerably fewer obstacles in the way of the top players and the clubs as they had during the previous World War.

=== Format ===
This season's cup competition began with a preliminary round, which was played on the week-end of 30 August 1942. The competition was to be completed on Easter Monday, 26 April 1943, with the final, which since 1937, was traditionally held in the country's capital, at the former Wankdorf Stadium in Bern. The preliminary round was held for the lower league teams that had not qualified themselves for the competition. The lower league teams that had qualified via their regional football association's own cup competitions, or had achieved their association's requirements, joined the competition in the first round. The clubs from this season's 1. Liga were given a bye for the first round and started in the second round. The clubs from the 1942–43 Nationalliga were given byes for the first three rounds. These teams joined the competition in the fourth round. With one exception, these games were played on the week-end of 3 January 1943.

The matches were played in a knockout format. In the event of a draw after 90 minutes, the match went into extra time. In the event of a draw at the end of extra time, if agreed between the clubs, a replay was foreseen and this was played on the visiting team's pitch. Rules and regulations to this situation were altered and amended continuously by each regional football association, due to the current situation (second world war). If the replay ended in a draw after extra time, or if a replay had not been agreed, a toss of a coin would establish the team that qualified for the next round.

== Preliminary round ==
The lower league teams that had not qualified themselves for the competition via their regional football association's own regional cup competitions or had not achieved their association's requirements, competed here in a kind of second chance round. Reserve teams were not admitted to the competition. The draw respected local regionalities. The preliminary round was played on Saturday 30 August 1942 and was contested by 108 teams.

=== Summary ===
Team 1	Score	Team 2
30 August 1942
FC Neuhausen	3–2	FC Thaygen
Kreuzlingen	4–1	Frauenfeld
SpVgg Schaffhausen	6–3	FC Schaffhausen
FC Romanshorn	1–0	FC Amriswil
Chur	6–4	FC Ems
FC Fortuna (SG)	3–1 (a.e.t.)	Herisau
Gossau	5–1	FC Flawil
FC Buchs (SG)	5–4	Arbon
FC Uzwil	3–2	FC Wil
FC Tössfeld (Winterthur)	7–1	Paradies Feuerthalen
FC Töss (Winterthur)	1–3	FC Winterthur
FC Phönix (Winterthur)	4–1	FC Oberwinterthur
SC Veltheim	9–1	FC Wülflingen
Wettingen	1–2	Uster
SV Seebach	3–2	Polizei Zürich
FC Stäfa (ZH)	5–0	FC Rapperswil
FC Lachen	5–2	FC Glarus
FC Wädenswil	5–3	FC Thalwil
FC Meilen	2–6	FC Horgen
FC Wallisellen	4–1	FC Wipkingen
Hakoah (ZH)	4–2	Black Boys (ZH)
FC Wiedikon	0–4	SV Höngg
FC Schlieren	3–1	FC Sipo (ZH)
FC Diana (ZH)	1–4	FC Industrie
Bülach	5–5 (a.e.t.)	Red Star
FC Altstetten (Zürich)	1–0	Ticinese (ZH)
FC Adliswil	1–2	FC Oerlikon
Cham	1–6	Kickers Luzern
Schöftland	1–3	Baden
Wohlen	3–2 (a.e.t.)	FC Gränichen
SC Schönenwerd	3–2	FC Kulm
FC Turgi	3–2	FC Unterentfelden
FC Erlinsbach	1–4	FC Muhen
Thun	0–2	FC Lerchenfeld (Thun)
FC Langnau im Emmental	2–3 (a.e.t.)	Burgdorf
FC Gerlafingen	3–4 (a.e.t.)	FC Biberist
FC Herzogenbuchsee	1–4	Minerva Bern
FC Länggasse (BE)	0–2	FC Victoria Bern
Martigny-Sports	7–1	FC Saint-Maurice
FC Chippis	3–2	FC Visp
Sion	2–7	FC Sierre
Cité Sportive	0–9	Stade Lausanne
FC Gland	2–1	Stade Nyonnais
Amical Saint-Prex	0–13	FC Forward Morges
Concordia Yverdon	6–1	FC Yverdon
FC Cossonay	1–3	FC Orbe
FC Vignoble Cully	2–1	FC Pully
Amical-Abattoirs (GE)	1–2	Union-Sports Carouge
FC Haute-Rive	2–4	FC Fleurier
Couvet-Sports	FF awd 3–0	FC Vallorbe
ES Malley	11–1 *	Rapid Lausanne
6 September 1942
Bulle	4–3	FC La Tour-de-Peilz
FC Richemond (FR)	1–7	Central Fribourg

- Note: the match ES Malley–Rapid Lausanne was played in Lutry.

Replay

Team 1	Score	Team 2
Date unknown
Red Star	– *	Bülach

- Note to the replay Red Star–Bülach: date of play and result remain unknown, but Bülach qualified for the next round.

== Round 1 ==
In the first round, the lower league teams that had already qualified themselves for the competition through their regional football association's own regional requirements competed here, together with the winners of the preliminary round. All the teams from this years 1. Liga were given a bye and they started in the next round. Whenever possible, the draw respected local regionalities. Most of the games of the first round were played on Saturday 27 September, however, some games were played a few weeks later.

=== Summary ===
Team 1	Score	Team 2
27 September 1942
Wohlen	3–0	Uster
Old Boys	1–2	SC Kleinhüningen
FC Victoria Bern	3–0	Minerva Bern
Kickers Luzern	6–3	Mendrisio
Moutier	6–0	FC Porrentruy
FC Buchs (SG)	3–4	FC Neuhausen
Gossau	1–2	Winterthur
FC Fortuna (SG)	2–4	FC Phönix (Winterthur)
FC Tössfeld (Winterthur)	8–3	FC Uzwil
SpVgg Schaffhausen	3–2	Kreuzlingen
SV Seebach	3–1 (a.e.t.)	SV Höngg
FC Oerlikon (ZH)	6–0	FC Industrie
Bülach	0–2	FC Altstetten (Zürich)
FC Turgi	1–3	Baden
Olympia Basel	2–1	Ballspielclub Basel
FC Ettingen	3–7 (a.e.t.)	FC Pratteln
Muttenz	2–5	Zofingen
Lengnau	3–2	FC Aurore Bienne
FC Rorschach	0–3	SC Veltheim
FC Romanshorn	3–4	Chur
FC Schlieren	0–2	FC Stäfa (ZH)
FC Näfels	4–3 (a.e.t.)	FC Horgen
FC Wädenswil	2–4	FC Lachen
SC Schönenwerd	6–3	Sporting Club Aarau
Binningen	6–1	Rot-Schwarz Basel
FC Breite (Basel)	5–1	FC Polizei Basel
FC Schönbühl	4–2	FC Lerchenfeld (Thun)
Burgdorf	3–2 (a.e.t.)	FC Langenthal
FC Biberist	3–2	FC Madretsch (Biel)
Köniz	2–5	SC Aegerten-Brügg
FC Tramelan	6–3	FC Reconvillier
FC Grünstern (Ipsach)	0–1	Fulgor Grenchen
FC Chippis	2–1	Martigny-Sports
Xamax Sports	2–0	Colombier
Gland	2–3	FC Jonction-Gardy (GE)
Stade Lausanne	1–1 (a.e.t.)	Racing Club Lausanne
CS International Genève	3–1	Union-Sports Carouge
FC Gloria La Chaux-de-Fonds	7–1	Couvet-Sports
FC Orbe	3–4 (a.e.t.)	FC Aigle
Stade Français Genève	2–4	ES Malley
Bulle	4–2	Concordia Yverdon
Central Fribourg	9–0	FC Vignoble Cully
FC Sierre	3–0	FC Fleurier
Hakoah Zürich	FF awd 0–3	FC Wallisellen
FC Brugg	FF awd 0–3	FC Muhen
11 October
FC Forward Morges	3–1	Chênois
8 November
FC Stade Payerne	2–3	Sylva-Sports Le Locle

Replay

Team 1	Score	Team 2
11 October
Racing Club Lausanne	2–2 (a.e.t.)	Stade Lausanne

Second replay

Team 1	Score	Team 2
11 October
Racing Club Lausanne	3–2	Stade Lausanne

=== Matches ===
27 September 1942

SC Schönenwerd	6–3	Sporting Club Aarau
Goal	FCA summary	Goal

Sportplatz Feld, Schönenwerd
- Schönenwerd and Sporting Club Aarau both played the 1942/1943 season in the 3. Liga (fourth tier)

== Round 2 ==
The winning teams from the first round were joined by the teams from this years 1. Liga to compete in the second round.

=== Summary ===
Team 1	Score	Team 2
7 November 1942
FC Näfels	1–4	FC Oerlikon (ZH)
15 November 1942
Winterthur	1–5	Brühl
FC Sierre	2–1	Monthey
Chur	1–4	Blue Stars
FC Breite (Basel)	1–2	Concordia
Binningen	0–3	FC Birsfelden
FC Schönbühl	1–6	Bern
Burgdorf	0–1	Fribourg
FC Helvetia Bern	1–1 (a.e.t.)	FC Biberist
FC Aigle	0–1 (a.e.t.)	Vevey Sports
FC Tramelan	1–6	Étoile-Sporting
FC Gloria La Chaux-de-Fonds	1–7	La Chaux-de-Fonds
Central Fribourg	0–1	FC Forward Morges
CS International Genève	1–0 (a.e.t.)	CA Genève
US Pro Daro	5–1	SV Seebach
SC Zug	3–0	FC Wallisellen
Fulgor Grenchen	1–4	Solothurn
Aarau	6–2	Lengnau
SC Aegerten-Brügg	1–4	SC Derendingen
FC Muhen	0–2	Wohlen
SC Schönenwerd	0–3	SpVgg Schaffhausen
FC Tössfeld (Winterthur)	2–1	FC Neuhausen
FC Phönix (Winterthur)	4–0	SC Veltheim
ES Malley	2–1 (a.e.t.) annulled	FC Chippis
Moutier	2–0	Xamax-Sports
FC Victoria Bern	0–2	US Bienne-Boujean
Racing Club Lausanne	1–2	Montreux-Sports
Bulle	0–2	FC Renens
Dopolavoro Genève	0–2	Sylva-Sports Le Locle
FC Jonction-Gardy (GE)	0–2	Urania Genève Sport
FC Lachen	1–1 (a.e.t.)	FC Stäfa (ZH)
Zofingen	1–1 (a.e.t.)	Olympia Basel
22 November 1942
Baden	0–7	Bellinzona
Locarno	FF awd 3–0	FC Altstetten (Zürich)
29 November 1942
SC Kleinhüningen	1–2	FC Pratteln
Chiasso	FF awd 3–0	Kickers Luzern

- Note: the result of the match Malley–Chippis was annulled and replayed in Chippis.

Replays

Team 1	Score	Team 2
22 November 1942
FC Stäfa (ZH)	0–3	FC Lachen
Olympia Basel	2–4	Zofingen
29 November 1942
FC Biberist	2–1	FC Helvetia Bern
FC Chippis	4–2 (a.e.t.)	ES Malley

=== Matches ===
15 November 1942

Aarau	6–2	Lengnau
Goal	FCA summary	Goal

Stadion Brügglifeld, Aarau
- Aarau played the 1942/43 season in the 1. Liga (second tier), Lengnau in the 2. Liga (third tier).

== Round 3 ==
=== Summary ===
Team 1	Score	Team 2
13 December 1942
Vevey Sports	2–0	Sylva-Sports Le Locle
FC Sierre	1–3	Urania Genève Sport
Chiasso	4–0	FC Oerlikon (ZH)
Moutier	2–4	Montreux-Sports
FC Renens	1–2 (a.e.t.)	Étoile-Sporting
US Bienne-Boujean	4–2	Fribourg
FC Pratteln	3–2 (a.e.t.)	Zofingen
US Pro Daro	2–1	Blue Stars
FC Birsfelden	1–2	FC Helvetia Bern
FC Tössfeld (Winterthur)	0–1	Aarau
Locarno	3–1	SC Zug
Wohlen	0–2	Concordia
La Chaux-de-Fonds	4–0	CS International Genève
FC Phönix (Winterthur)	6–0	FC Lachen
Brühl	2–0	Bellinzona
SC Derendingen	0–7 *	Bern
Solothurn	1–1 (a.e.t.)	Schaffhausen
20 December 1942
FC Chippis	0–1	FC Forward Morges

- The match Derendingen–Bern was played in Bern.

Replay

Team 1	Score	Team 2
27 December 1942
Schaffhausen	3–1	Solothurn

=== Matches ===
13 December 1942

FC Tössfeld (Winterthur)	0–1	Aarau
	FCA summary	Goal

Talgut, Winterthur
- Tössfeld played the 1942/43 season in the 2. Liga (third tier)

== Round 4 ==
The teams from this season's Nationalliga, who had received a bye for the first three rounds, entered the cup competition in this round. The teams from the Nationalliga were seeded and could not be drawn against each other. Whenever possible, the draw respected local regionalities. The fourth round was played on the first Sunday in the new year, with one exception played a week earlier.

=== Summary ===
Team 1	Score	Team 2
27 December 1942
La Chaux-de-Fonds	4–1	Vevey Sports
3 January 1943
Aarau	ppd	Young Boys
Lausanne-Sport	ppd	Étoile-Sporting
Montreux-Sports	ppd	Servette
Urania Genève Sport	3–4	Cantonal Neuchâtel
Chiasso	0–6	Grasshopper Club
Biel-Bienne	5–0	FC Forward Morges
Young Fellows	4–1	US Bienne-Boujean
Grenchen	4–0	Bern
FC Phönix (Winterthur)	2–7 (a.e.t.)	Brühl
Luzern	0–1	Locarno
Nordstern	4–0	Concordia
Basel	6–0	FC Pratteln
St. Gallen	1–3 *	SV Schaffhausen
US Pro Daro	0–4	Lugano
FC Helvetia Bern	0–1	Zürich

- Note: The match St.Gallen–SV Schaffhausen was played in Schaffhausen.

Re-dated

Team 1	Score	Team 2
10 January 1943
Aarau	2–2 (a.e.t.)	Young Boys
Lausanne-Sport	2–3	Étoile-Sporting
Montreux-Sports	0–4	Servette

Replays

Team 1	Score	Team 2
17 January 1943
Young Boys	3–1	Aarau

=== Matches ===
3 January 1943
14:30

Basel	6–0	FC Pratteln
Schmidlin (I) (2x); Andres (2x); Kappenberger (1x); Suter (1x)	FCB summary

Landhof, Basel
Attendance: 2,700
Referee: (Switzerland) Josef Schürch (Winterthur)
- Pratteln played the 1942/43 season in the 2. Liga (third tier)

3 January 1943

FC Helvetia Bern	0–1	Zürich
	FCZ summary	60' (0:1) Bosshard

Spitalacker, Bern
Attendance: 1,200
Referee: (Switzerland) Jean Lutz (Geneva)
- Helvetia played the 1942/43 season in the 1. Liga (second tier)

10 January 1943

Aarau	2–2 (a.e.t.)	Young Boys
Hofer 55' (1:1); Hofer 93' (2:1)	FCA summary	41' (0:1) Blaser; 115' (2:2) Bernhard

Stadion Brügglifeld, Aarau
- Aarau played the 1942/43 season in the 1. Liga (second tier)

17 January 1943
Replay

Young Boys	3–1	Aarau
40' (pen.) (2:1); Blaser 86' (3:1)	FCA summary	50' (pen.) Schär

Wankdorf Stadium, Bern

10 January 1943

Montreux-Sports	0–4	Servette
	Servette summary	2x Perroud; 1x Pasteur; 1x Buchoux

Stade de Chailly, Montreux
- Montreux played the 1942/43 season in the 1. Liga (second tier)

== Round 5 ==
=== Summery ===
Team 1	Score	Team 2
10 January 1943
Young Fellows	1–3	Grenchen
Locarno	3–2	Nordstern
Lugano	2–1	Zürich
Basel	9–2	SV Schaffhausen
Biel-Bienne	ppd	La Chaux-de-Fonds
Cantonal Neuchâtel	ppd	Grasshopper Club
17 January 1943
Étoile-Sporting	1–9 *	Servette
31 January 1943
Brühl	0–2	Young Boys

- Note: The match Étoile-Sporting–Servette was played in Geneva.

Re-dated

Team 1	Score	Team 2
17 January 1943
Biel-Bienne	1–2	La Chaux-de-Fonds
31 January 1943
Cantonal Neuchâtel	0–2	Grasshopper Club

=== Matches ===
10 January 1943

Lugano	2–1	Zürich
Frigerio 36' (1:0); Bossoni 70' (2:0)	FCZ summary	85' (2:1) Spengler

Campo Marzio, Lugano
Attendance: 2,000
Referee: (Switzerland) Eugen Scherz (Bern)

10 January 1943
14:30

Basel	9–2	SV Schaffhausen
Suter (3x); Schmidlin (I) (3x); Kappenberger (1x); Losa (1x); 74' (o.g.)	Summary	15' (1:1) Büche; 67' (7:2) Meier

Landhof, Basel
Attendance: 3,950
Referee: (Switzerland) Paul von Wartburg (Bern)
- Schaffhausen played the 1942/43 season in the 2. Liga (third tier)

10 January 1943

Brühl	0–2	Young Boys
	[ summary]	47' (0:1) Lanz; 50' (0:2) Blaser

Paul-Grüninger-Stadion, St. Gallen
- Brühl played the 1942/43 season in the 1. Liga (second tier)

17 January 1943

Étoile-Sporting	1–9	Servette
Knecht (pen.)	Servette summary	2x Pasteur; 5x Perroud; 1x Walaschek; 1x Neury

Centre Sportif de la Charrière, La Chaux-de-Fonds
- Étoile-Sporting played the 1942/43 season in the 1. Liga (second tier)

== Quarter-finals ==
=== Summary ===
Team 1	Score	Team 2
28 February 1943
Grasshopper Club	1–0	La Chaux-de-Fonds
Servette	1–0	Grenchen
Young Boys	0–5	Locarno
Basel	0–2	Lugano

=== Matches ===
28 February 1943

Grasshopper Club	1–0	La Chaux-de-Fonds
Friedländer 71' (1:0)	summary

Hardturm, Zürich
- La Chaux-de-Fonds played the 1942/43 season in the 1. Liga (second tier)

28 February 1943

Servette	1–0	Grenchen
Belli 17' (1:0)	Servette summary

Stade des Charmilles, Geneva
- Grenchen played the 1942/43 season in the 2. Liga (third tier)

28 February 1943

Young Boys	0–5	Locarno
	summary	30' (1:0) Casè; 3x Rey; 1x Ciseri

Wankdorf Stadium, Bern

28 February 1943
15:00

Basel	0–2	Lugano
	FCB summary	16' (0:1) Frigerio; 61' (0:2) Frigerio

Landhof, Basel
Attendance: 7,400
Referee: (Switzerland) Paul von Wartburg (Bern)

== Semi-finals ==
=== Summary ===
Team 1	Score	Team 2
28 March 1943
Grasshopper Club	4–1	Servette
Lugano	7–0	Locarno

=== Matches ===
28 March 1943

Grasshopper Club	4–1	Servette
Friedländer 1' (1:0); Friedländer 63' (2:1); Friedländer 77' (3:1); Bickel 87' (4:1)	summary	30' (1:1) Perroud

Wankdorf Stadium, Bern
Attendance: 8,000
Referee: (Switzerland) Mario Grassi (Bellinzona)

28 March 1943

Lugano	7–0	Locarno
Bossoni 17' (1:0); 33' (2:0); 48' (pen.); 56' (4:0); 62' (pen.); Frigerio 76' (6:0); Fornara 85' (7:0)	summary

Campo Marzio, Lugano
Attendance: 5,100
Referee: (Switzerland) Hans Wüthrich (Bern)

== Final ==
The final was traditionally held in the capital Bern, at the former Wankdorf Stadium, on Easter Monday.

=== Summary ===
Team 1	Score	Team 2
26 April 1943
Grasshopper Club	2–1	Lugano

=== Telegram ===
26 April 1943
15:00

Grasshopper Club	2–1	Lugano
Amadò 36' (1:1); H. Bianchi 54' (2:1)	Fussball-Schweiz summary	22' (0:1) Frigerio

Wankdorf Stadium, Bern
Attendance: 18,260
Referee: (Switzerland) Paul von Wartburg (Bern)

Grasshopper Club won the cup and this was the club's 10th cup title to this date. Two months later, on 20 June 1943, they also finished the league as champions, therefore, they secured themselves the double for the second time in a row and it was the fourth time in their history that they had achieved the double to this date.

== Further in Swiss football ==
- 1942–43 Nationalliga
- 1942–43 Swiss 1. Liga

== Sources ==
- Fussball-Schweiz
- FCB Cup games 1942–43 at fcb-achiv.ch
- Switzerland 1942–43 at RSSSF

Preceded by 1941–42	Swiss Cup seasons	Succeeded by 1943–44
