= Hugo Lamanna =

Argentine footballer (1913–1991)

Personal information
- Date of birth: 3 March 1913
- Place of birth: Buenos Aires, Argentina
- Date of death: 11 October 1991 (aged 78)
- Place of death: Rapallo, Italy
- Height: 1.79 m (5 ft 10 in)
- Position: Forward

Senior career*
Years	Team	Apps	(Gls)
1928–1932	Talleres (RdE)		
1933	Independiente		
1934–1935	Vasco da Gama	22	(22)
1935	Talleres (RdE)		
1936	Stade Français		
1936–1937	Talleres (RdE)		
1937	Vélez Sarsfield		
1937–1938	CA Paris		
1939–1941	Racing Club de France		
1942–1944	Atalanta		
1945	Legnano		
1945–1946	Ausonia Pro Gorla		
1946–1947	Juve Stabia		
1947–1948	Frosinone		

Managerial career
- 1948–1949: Frosinone
- 1949–1953: Lecco
- 1953–1960: Como
- 1960–1964: Monza
- 1965–1966: Bari
- 1966–1967: Rapallo Ruentes
- 1967–1969: Rimini
- 1970–1972: Rapallo Ruentes
- 1974–1975: Rapallo Ruentes
- * Club domestic league appearances and goals

Hugo Lamanna (3 March 1913 – 11 October 1991) was an Argentine professional football player and manager, who played as a forward.

== Playing career ==
Having started his career at CA Talleres de Remedios de Escalada with only 15 years old, Lamanna gained prominence especially playing outside the country, such as in Brazil, Italy and France.

Lamanna was the first foreign player to score a goal for CR Vasco da Gama, in addition to having scored four goals in a single match, against Corinthians.

== Managerial career ==
Lamanna coached important Italian football teams such as Frosinone, Como, Monza, Bari and Rimini. He was most notable for Lecco, where he won some of the lower divisions.

== Honours ==
=== Player ===
Vasco da Gama

- Campeonato Carioca: 1934 (LCF)

Racing Club de France

- Coupe de France: 1939, 1940

Individual

- 1937–38 French Division 2 top scorer: 29 goals

=== Manager ===
Lecco

- Promozione: 1949-50
