= Alessandro Frigerio =

Swiss-Colombian footballer (1914–1979)

Personal information
- Full name: Alessandro Frigerio Payán
- Date of birth: 15 November 1914
- Place of birth: Tumaco, Colombia
- Date of death: 10 January 1979 (aged 64)
- Position: Striker

Youth career
- 1930: Lugano
- 1931: Liverpool
- 1931–1932: Servette

Senior career*
| Years | Team | Apps | (Gls) |
| 1932–1937 | Young Fellows Zürich | | (50+) |
| 1937–1938 | Le Havre | 24+ | (35) |
| 1939–1942 | Lugano | | (72+) |
| 1943–1946 | Bellinzona | | (17+) |
| 1947–1949 | Chiasso | 20+ | (7+) |

International career
| 1932–1937 | Switzerland | 10 | (1) |

Managerial career
- 1947–1948: Chiasso (player-manager)
- 1951: Chiasso
- * Club domestic league appearances and goals

Alessandro Frigerio Payán (15 November 1914 – 10 January 1979) was a Swiss-Colombian footballer who played as a forward.

== Club career ==
Frigerio began his career in the youth team of Lugano in 1930. After spending some time in the youth team of English club Liverpool, he returned to Switzerland, where he joined Servette.

Frigerio made his professional debut in the Young Fellows Juventus, where he played for eight years, during which they won the 1935–36 Swiss Cup. Frigerio was the scorer of the 1936–37 Nationalliga.

In mid-1937, Frigerio was acquired by the French club Le Havre, with whom he won the 1937–38 French Division 2. After that season returned to Switzerland, due to the outbreak of the Second World War. Between 1939 and 1942 he played for Lugano, with whom he won the 1940–41 Nationalliga and were runners up in the 1942–43 Swiss Cup, being the goalscorer of the 1940–41 and 1941–42 Nationalliga.

Frigerio played four years at the club Bellinzona, and ended his career in 1949 at the club Chiasso.

== International career ==
Frigerio made his international debut on 6 March 1932 at the age of 17 (a record that lasted a long time) in a friendly match against Germany in Leipzig that ended in a 2–0 defeat. Frigerio played a total of 10 matches between 1932 and 1937, and scored his only goal in a 2–2 draw against Yugoslavia on 24 September 1933 in a 1934 FIFA World Cup qualifier match. He was called for the 1938 FIFA World Cup squad; however, he did not play any matches.

== Managerial career ==
Frigerio played 1947–48 Nationalliga B as a player-manager of Chiasso. That year, the team was the runner-up in the league, tied on 36 points with Urania Genève Sport, which was promoted for next year. The next season, Italian Alfredo Foni (also player-manager) replaced Frigerio as coach. Frigerio left football in 1949, returned as manager of Chiasso in 1951, and retired again that year.

== Personal life ==
Son of Swiss Reinaldo Frigeiro, a consul, and Colombian María Payán, Alessandro lived in Buenaventura until age 8. He married and the couples son Roberto was born in Le Havre during the time that he played for Le Havre AC. Roberto was also to become professional footballer and Swiss international.

== Career statistics ==
=== Club ===
This table is incomplete, thus some stats and totals could be incorrect.

| Club performance | | | League | | Cup | | Continental | | Total | |
| Season | Club | League | Apps | Goals | Apps | Goals | Apps | Goals | Apps | Goals |
| Switzerland | | | League | | Cup | | Europe | | Total | |
|---|---|---|---|---|---|---|---|---|---|---|
| 1935–36 | Young Fellows Zürich | Nationalliga | - | 27 | - | - | - | - | - | 27 |
| 1936–37 | Young Fellows Zürich | Nationalliga | - | 23 | - | - | - | - | - | 23 |
| France | | | League | | Cup | | Europe | | Total | |
| 1937–38 | Le Havre | Division 2 | - | 19 | - | - | - | - | - | 19 |
| 1938–39 | Le Havre | Division 1 | 24 | 16 | - | - | - | - | 24 | 16 |
| Switzerland | | | League | | Cup | | Europe | | Total | |
| 1940–41 | Lugano | Nationalliga | - | 26 | - | - | - | - | - | 26 |
| 1941–42 | Lugano | Nationalliga | - | 23 | - | - | - | - | - | 23 |
| 1942–43 | Lugano | Nationalliga | - | 23 | - | - | - | - | - | 23 |
| 1946–47 | Bellinzona | Nationalliga A | - | 17 | - | - | - | - | - | 17 |
| 1948–49 | Chiasso | Nationalliga A | 20 | 7 | - | - | - | - | 20 | 7 |
| Total | France | | 24+ | 35 | 0 | 0 | 0 | 0 | 24+ | 35 |
| Total | Switzerland | | 20+ | 146+ | 0 | 0 | 0 | 0 | 20+ | 146+ |
| Total | Career total | | 44+ | 181+ | 0 | 0 | 0 | 0 | 44+ | 181+ |

=== International ===
==== International appearances ====
| Team | Year | Apps | Goals |
|---|---|---|---|
| Switzerland | 1932 | 2 | 0 |
| Switzerland | 1933 | 2 | 1 |
| Switzerland | 1934 | 1 | 0 |
| Switzerland | 1935 | 3 | 0 |
| Switzerland | 1936 | 1 | 0 |
| Switzerland | 1937 | 1 | 0 |
| Total | | 10 | 1 |

==== International goals ====
International goals
| No. | Date | Venue | Opponent | Score | Result | Competition |
|---|---|---|---|---|---|---|
| 1 | 1933-09-24 | Stadion BSK, Belgrade, Yugoslavia | Yugoslavia | 2–1 | 2–2 | 1934 FIFA World Cup qualification |

== Honours ==
=== Club ===
Bellinzona

- 1. Liga (1): 1943–44

Chiasso

- Nationalliga B:

Runner-up (1): 1947–48

Le Havre

- Division 2 (1): 1937–38

Lugano

- Nationalliga (1): 1940–41
- Swiss Cup:

Runner-up (1): 1942–43

Young Fellows Zürich

- Swiss Cup (1): 1935–36

=== Individual ===
- Nationalliga top goalscorer (3): 1936–37, 1940–41, 1941–42
