= 1941–42 Swiss Cup =

Tournament details
- Country: Switzerland

Final positions
- Champions: Grasshopper Club
- Runners-up: Basel

The 1941–42 Swiss Cup was the 17th season of Switzerland's football cup competition, organised annually since the 1925–26 season by the Swiss Football Association.

== Overview ==
=== Preamble ===
In Switzerland during the second world war period, sport became an integral part of the "spiritual national defense". This was a political and cultural movement that had already become increasingly important during the late 1930s. Politicians, intellectuals and media professionals had increasingly called for measures to strengthen Switzerland's basic cultural values. Since the Nationalliga games were also considered to be one of the activities that seemed important for maintaining the morale of the population, the military authorities put considerably fewer obstacles in the way of the top players and leading clubs as they had during the previous World War. However, in 1941, the "Lex Zumbühl", named after the Swiss Football Association (ASF/SFV) president, formally banned professional football players. In addition to this, the number of foreign players allowed to play was reduced from three to one per team.

=== Format ===
This season's cup competition began with a preliminary round, which began on the week-end of 24 August 1941. However, most of the games were played a week later. The competition was to be completed on Easter Monday, 6 April 1942, with the final, which since 1937, was traditionally held in the country's capital, at the former Wankdorf Stadium in Bern. The preliminary round was held for the lower league teams that had not qualified themselves for the competition. The lower league teams that had qualified via their regional football association's own cup competitions, or had achieved their association's requirements, joined the competition in the first round. The clubs from this season's 1. Liga were given a bye for the first round and started in the second round. The clubs from the 1941–42 Nationalliga were given byes for the first three rounds. These teams joined the competition in the fourth round. These games were played on the week-end before Christmas on 21 December 1941.

The matches were played in a knockout format. In the event of a draw after 90 minutes, the match went into extra time. In the event of a draw at the end of extra time, if agreed between the clubs, a replay was foreseen and this was played on the visiting team's pitch. Rules and regulations to this situation were altered and amended continuously by each regional football association, due to the current situation (second world war). If the replay ended in a draw after extra time, or if a replay had not been agreed, a toss of a coin would establish the team that qualified for the next round.

== Preliminary round ==
The lower league teams that had not qualified themselves for the competition via their regional football association's own regional cup competitions or had not achieved their association's requirements, competed here in a kind of second chance round. Reserve teams were not admitted to the competition. The draw respected local regionalities. The preliminary started on Saturday 24 August 1941. However, most of the games were played a week later. This round was contested by 98 teams.

=== Summary ===
Team 1	Score	Team 2
24 August 1941
FC Allschwil	1–3	FC Riehen
SC Kleinhüningen	6–1	Black Stars
FC Liestal	4–3	SV Sissach
Delémont	4–3 (a.e.t.)	FC Porrentruy
Binningen	9–1	FC Breite (Basel)
31 August 1941
FC Diana (ZH)	0–2	SV Höngg
FC Wallisellen	6–2	FC Meilen
FC Lachen	7–0	FC Horgen
FC Flawil	1–5	Arbon
Gossau	4–2	Herisau
Frauenfeld	2–3	FC Amriswil
Chur	0–1	FC St. Margrethen (SG)
FC Töss (Winterthur)	0–0 (a.e.t.)	FC Oberwinterthur
FC Phönix (Winterthur)	1–0	FC Tössfeld (Winterthur)
FC Fortuna (SG)	4–6	FC Rorschach
FC Ems	3–1	FC Widnau
FC Wetzikon	1–5	Uster
FC Wiedikon	2–1	FC Oerlikon
FC Dietikon	0–6	Baden
Wohlen	4–1	FC Lenzburg
FC Turgi	2–1	Wettingen
Gränichen	2–1	FC Unterentfelden
Thun	3–0	Burgdorf
Lengnau	1–2	FC Grünstern (Ipsach)
FC Helvetia Bern	2–1	FC Ostermundigen
Minerva Bern	7–3	Zähringia Bern
Kickers Luzern	6–1	Cham
Fulgor Grenchen	2–2 (a.e.t.)	Wacker Grenchen
FC Fontenais	0–3	FC Aesch
FC Richemond (FR)	1–1 (a.e.t.)	FC Stade Payerne
FC Fleurier	1–5	Xamax-Sports (NE)
Colombier	3–2	FC Hauterive
FC La Neuveville	6–3	FC Comète Peseux
FC Reconvilier	2–4	Saint-Imier-Sports
FC Tramelan	1–2	FC Tavannes
FC Gloria (Le Locle)	0–2	FC Floria (La Chaux-de-Fonds)
FC Concordia Yverdon	5–2	FC Orbe
Vallorbe-Sports	1–0	FC Yverdon
FC Saint-Maurice	3–4	FC Chippis
FC Gland	3–1	FC Gardy-Jonction
Stade Nyonnais	9–0	FC Lemania (Vallée de Joux)
ES Malley	4–1	Pully
FC Ouchy Olympic	2–4	Stade Lausanne
Amical-Abattoirs (GE)	3–2	FC Cointrin
Stade Français (GE)	0–1	CS International Genève
Union-Sport (GE)	1–2	Compesières
21 September 1941
FC Aigle	1–2	Martigny-Sports
FC Renens	4–1	CS La Tour-de-Peilz

Replays

Team 1	Score	Team 2
7 September 1941
FC Oberwinterthur	1–2	FC Töss (Winterthur)
14 September 1941
FC Stade Payerne	2–1	FC Richemond (FR)
date unknown
Wacker Grenchen	– *	Fulgor Grenchen

- Note to the replay Wacker–Fulgor: date of play and result remain unknown, but Wacker qualified for the next round.

== Round 1 ==
In the first round, the lower league teams that had already qualified themselves for the competition through their regional football association's own regional requirements competed here, together with the winners of the preliminary round. All the teams from this years 1. Liga were given a bye and they started in the next round. Whenever possible, the draw respected local regionalities. The first round were played on 28 September.

=== Summary ===
Team 1	Score	Team 2
28 September 1941
FC Lachen	12–0	FC Wädenswil
FC Adliswil	2–0	Schöftland
Kickers Luzern	2–1	Luzerner SC
FC Langenthal	1–2	FC Gerlafingen
FC Olten	4–3	FC Aesch
US Pro Daro	5–0	SC Wipkingen
Winterthur	0–1	Gossau
FC Amriswil	0–1	FC Phönix (Winterthur)
VfR Rasenspiele (Basel)	3–2	FC Rheinfelden
FC Liestal	1–5	FC Pratteln
FC Altdorf (Uri)	0–3	Emmenbrücke
FC Erlinsbach	2–1	Wohlen
FC Biberist	6–0	FC Kestenholz
FC Mett	3–1	Wacker Grenchen
Thun	0–1	FC Langnau im Emmental
Zähringia Bern	3–2	FC Länggasse Bern
FC Wülflingen	3–4	FC Töss (Winterthur)
FC Rorschach	0–5	Arbon
FC Helvetia Bern	3–2	FC Viktoria Bern
FC Ems	2–0	FC St. Margrethen (SG)
Kreuzlingen	4–1	FC Neuhausen
SV Seebach	3–2	FC Wiedikon
FC Bülach	1–1 (a.e.t.)	AS Ticinese Zürich (t)
FC Riehen	2–3	Binningen
SC Kleinhüningen	10–2	Dornach
FC Altstetten (Zürich)	7–1	SV Höngg
FC Schönenwerd	6–0	FC Buchs
FC Gränichen	3–6	Baden
FC Turgi	3–2	Sporting Club Aarau
FC Grünstern (Ipsach)	3–1	FC Madretsch (Biel)
Laufen	1–2	Delémont
FC Aurore Bienne	4–0	SC Aegerten-Brügg
FC Wallisellen	3–2	Uster
Red Star	2–0	SV Schaffhausen
US Bottecchia (Basel)	0–2 (a.e.t.)	Old Boys
Stade Nyonnais	0–2	ES Malley
Saint-Imier-Sports	2–1	FC Tavannes
FC Chippis	4–2	Martigny-Sports
CS International Genève	3–1	FC Compesières
Couvet-Sports	4–5	FC La Neuveville
FC Gland	2–1	FC Renens
Chênois	2–4	Amical-Abattoirs (GE)
Stade Lausanne	1–0	Racing Club Lausanne
FC Richemond-Daillettes (FR)	1–3	Central Fribourg
Xamax-Sports (NE)	3–0	Colombier
FC Concordia Yverdon	7–2	Vallorbe-Sports
FC Floria (La Chaux-de-Fonds)	FF awd 3–0	FC Le Sentier

- Note match Bülach–Ticinese Zürich: no replay was agreed. AS Ticinese Zürich qualified on toss of a coin.
- Note: match Floria–Le Sentier was not played and was awarded 3–0 to FC Floria.

=== Matches ===
28 September 1941

FC Turgi	3–2	Sporting Club Aarau
Goal	FCA summary	Goal

Sportanlage Oberau, Turgi
- Turgi and Sporting Club Aarau both played the 1941/42 season in the 2. Liga (third tier)

== Round 2 ==
The winning teams from the first round were joined by the teams from this years 1. Liga to compete in the second round.

=== Summary ===
Team 1	Score	Team 2
16 November 1941
Juventus Zürich	2–1	FC Lachen
Blue Stars	3–0	FC Adliswil
Kickers Luzern	0–1	SC Zug
SC Derendingen	3–0	FC Gerlafingen
Chiasso	2–0 (a.e.t.)	FC Olten
US Pro Daro	1–3	Locarno
Étoile-Sporting	6–5	Saint-Imier-Sports
FC Chippis	1–1 (a.e.t.)	Monthey
Dopolavoro Genève	1–4 (a.e.t.)	CS International Genève
Vevey Sports	6–1	FC La Neuveville
CA Genève	2–1	FC Gland
Urania Genève Sport	1–0	Amical-Abattoirs (GE)
ES Malley	3–3 (a.e.t.)	FC Forward Morges
Stade Lausanne	2–1	Montreux-Sports
Brühl	4–2	Gossau
FC Phönix (Winterthur)	2–0	Schaffhausen
VfR Rasenspiele (Basel)	0–6	FC Birsfelden
FC Pratteln	0–2	Concordia Basel
Emmenbrücke	0–2	Bellinzona
FC Erlinsbach	1–6	Aarau
Solothurn	2–0	FC Biberist
FC Mett	0–3	US Bienne Boujean
Bern	6–0	FC Langnau im Emmental
Fribourg	6–1	Zähringia Bern
FC Töss (Winterthur)	3–0	Arbon
FC Helvetia Bern	5–1	Central Fribourg
Xamax-Sports (NE)	1–2	FC Concordia Yverdon
FC Ems	1–3 (a.e.t.)	Kreuzlingen
SV Seebach	5–1	AS Ticinese Zürich
Binningen	2–3	SC Kleinhüningen
FC Altstetten (Zürich)	5–1	FC Schönenwerd
Baden	5–2	FC Turgi
FC Grünstern (Ipsach)	1–0	Delémont
FC Aurore Bienne	4–1	FC Floria (La Chaux-de-Fonds)
FC Wallisellen	0–3	Red Star
23 November 1941
Basel	4–2 (a.e.t.)	Old Boys

Replays

Team 1	Score	Team 2
30 November 1941
Monthey	4–2	FC Chippis
FC Forward Morges	0–1	ES Malley

=== Matches ===
16 November 1941

FC Erlinsbach	1–6	Aarau
Goal	FCA summary	Goal

Sportplatz Breite, Erlinsbach, Aargau
- Erlinsbach played the 1941/42 season in the 2. Liga (third tier) and Aarau in the 1. Liga (second tier)

23 November 1941
14:30

Basel	4–2 (a.e.t.)	Old Boys
Elsässer (red card) 46'; Rupf 86' (pen. 1:2); Kappenberger 90' (2:2); Suter 115' (3:2); Rupf (pen. 4:2)	FCB summary	20' (0:1) Oeschger; 83' (0:2) Hediger

Landhof, Basel
Attendance: 800
Referee: (Switzerland) François Hofer (Moutier)
- Basel played the 1941/42 season in the 1. Liga (second tier) and Old Boys in the 2. Liga (third tier)

== Round 3 ==
=== Summary ===
Team 1	Score	Team 2
7 December 1941
FC Birsfelden	2–2 (a.e.t.)	Basel
Solothurn	FF awd 3–0	FC Grünstern (Ipsach)
Locarno	1–0	FC Altstetten (Zürich)
Blue Stars	1–3	Baden
Bellinzona	2–3	SC Zug
Fribourg	2–0	Aarau
ES Malley	3–2	CA Genève
Kreuzlingen	0–2	Brühl
SC Derendingen	1–1 (a.e.t.)	FC Aurore Bienne
Monthey	1–3	Vevey Sports
Urania Genève Sport	2–1	CS International Genève
Stade Lausanne	1–3	FC Concordia Yverdon
SC Kleinhüningen	4–1	Concordia Basel
Red Star	1–0	Juventus Zürich
FC Phönix (Winterthur)	1–2	FC Töss (Winterthur)
FC Helvetia Bern	0–3	Bern
SV Seebach	2–1	Chiasso
US Bienne Boujean	1–1 (a.e.t.)	Étoile-Sporting

Replays

Team 1	Score	Team 2
14 December 1941
Basel	1–0	FC Birsfelden
FC Aurore Bienne	1–0	SC Derendingen
Étoile-Sporting	1–1 (a.e.t.)	US Bienne Boujean (t)

- Note (t): US Bienne Boujean qualified on toss of a coin.

=== Matches ===
7 December 1941
14:30

FC Birsfelden	2–2 (a.e.t.)	Basel
Dussy (1:0) von Arx (2:1)	FCB summary	(1:1) Vonthron (2:2) Rupf

Sportplatz Sternenfeld, Birsfelden
Attendance: 500
Referee: (Switzerland) Theodor Ott Oerlikon (Zürich)
- Birsfelden played the 1941/42 season in the 2. Liga (third tier)

14 December 1941
10:00
Replay

Basel	1–0	FC Birsfelden
Suter 53' (1:0)	FCB summary

Landhof, Basel
Attendance: 2,000
Referee: (Switzerland) Eugen Scherz (Bern)

7 December 1941

Fribourg	2–0	Aarau
Goal	FCA summary

== Round 4 ==
The teams from this season's Nationalliga, who had received a bye for the first three rounds, entered the cup competition in this round. The teams from the Nationalliga were seeded and could not be drawn against each other. Whenever possible, the draw respected local regionalities. The fourth round was played the week-end before Christmas.

=== Summary ===
Team 1	Score	Team 2
21 December 1941
Lugano	6–1	Locarno
Baden	0–2	SC Zug
Fribourg	1–1 (a.e.t.)	Servette
Lausanne-Sport	7–2	ES Malley
Grasshopper Club	5–0	Brühl
Biel-Bienne	3–1	FC Aurore Bienne
Vevey Sports	3–1	Urania Genève Sport
Cantonal Neuchâtel	6–0	FC Concordia Yverdon
Basel	3–0	Young Boys
Solothurn	1–0	Nordstern
VfR Kleihüningen	1–3	Luzern
La Chaux-de-Fonds	3–1 (a.e.t.)	US Bienne Boujean
Zürich	7–1	Red Star
FC Töss (Winterthur)	1–2	St. Gallen
Bern	0–6	Grenchen
Young Fellows	4–0	SV Seebach

Replay

Team 1	Score	Team 2
18 January 1942
Servette	5–4 (a.e.t.)	Fribourg

=== Matches ===
21 December 1941

Fribourg	1–1 (a.e.t.)	Servette
Goal	Servette summary	Monnard

Stade Universitaire, Fribourg
- Fribourg played the 1941/42 season in the 1. Liga (second tier)

18 January 1942
Replay

Servette	5–4 (a.e.t.)	Fribourg
1x A. Abegglen; 1x Belli; 3x Monnard	Servette summary	Goal

Stade des Charmilles, Geneva

21 December 1941
14:30

Basel	3–0	BSC Young Boys
Suter 13' (1:0); Kappenberger 39' (2:0); Rupf 50' (3:0)	FCB summary

Landhof, Basel
Attendance: 4,000
Referee: (Switzerland) William Bangerter (La Chaux-de-Fonds)

21 December 1941
10:15

Zürich	7–1	Red Star
Andres 7' (1:0); Walter 11' (2:0); Neumeyer 35' (3:0); Andres 40' (4:0); Andres 50' (5:0); Neumeyer 60' (6:0); Neumeyer 85' (7:1)	FCZ summary	61' (6:1) Egli

Letzigrund, Zürich
Attendance: 400
Referee: (Switzerland) Gotthilf Huber (Dietikon)
- Red Star played the 1941/42 season in the 2. Liga (third tier)

== Round 5 ==
=== Summary ===
Team 1	Score	Team 2
22 February 1942
Servette	1–2	Lausanne-Sport
Lugano	5–1	SC Zug
Vevey Sports	1–3	Cantonal Neuchâtel
15 March 1942
Grasshopper Club	5–0	Biel-Bienne
Basel	6–1	Solothurn
Luzern	5–0	La Chaux-de-Fonds
Zürich	4–3	St. Gallen
Grenchen	1–0	Young Fellows

=== Matches ===
22 February 1942

Servette	1–2	Lausanne-Sport
A. Abegglen	Servette summary	Goal

Stade des Charmilles, Geneva

15 March 1942
15:00

Basel	6–1	Solothurn
Suter 2' (1:0); Grieder 38' (2:1); Vonthron 42' (3:1); Grieder (4:1); Suter 61' (5:1); Grieder (6:1)	FCB summary	32' (1:1) Beetschen

Landhof, Basel
Attendance: 3,000
Referee: (Switzerland) von Wartburg (Bern)
- Note: Solothurn waived their home advantage due to strong competition from the other cup matches near-by, Biel-GC and Grenchen-Young Fellows.
- From 60th minute Solothurn down to ten players due to an injury.
- Solothurn played the 1941/42 season in the 2. Liga (third tier).

15 March 1942

Zürich	4–3	St. Gallen
Bosshard 15' (1:1); Bosshard 38' (2:1); Andres 75' (3:1); Andres 84' (4:2)	FCZ summary	8' (0:1) Giacometti; (penalty missed) 60′ Walter Meier; 83' (3:2) Wagner; 87' (o.g.) Zaugg

Letzigrund, Zürich
Attendance: 3,500
Referee: (Switzerland) Hans Vogt (Schweizerhalle)

== Quarter-finals ==
=== Summary ===
Team 1	Score	Team 2
22 March 1942
Luzern	0–2	Grasshopper Club
Cantonal Neuchâtel	0–6	Lausanne-Sport
Basel (t)	1–1 (a.e.t.)	Lugano
Zürich	2–3	Grenchen

- Note (t) match Basel–Lugano: The teams could not agree upon a replay date. Lugano offered a midweek match in Lucerne or Zurich. Basel stated that its players in military-duty would not be allowed to play a weekday match. Basel qualified on toss of a coin.

=== Matches ===
22 March 1942
15:00

Basel	1–1 (a.e.t.)	Lugano
Grieder 90' (1:1)	FCB summary	53' (0:1) M. Fornara

Stadion Rankhof, Basel
Attendance: 7.500
Referee: (Switzerland) Rodolphe Wittwer (Geneva)
- Basel qualified on toss of a coin.

22 March 1942

Zürich	2–3	Grenchen
Andres 27' (1:1); Zaugg 59' (2:3)	FCZ summary	8' (0:1) Righetti; 31' (o.g.) Weiermann; 35' (1:3) Aebi

Letzigrund, Zürich
Attendance: 5,000
Referee: (Switzerland) Emil Heiniger (Bern)

== Semi-finals ==
=== Summary ===
Team 1	Score	Team 2
29 March 1942
Grasshopper Club	2–1	Lausanne-Sport
Basel	0–0	Grenchen

Replay

Team 1	Score	Team 2
4 April 1942
Grenchen	0–2	Basel

=== Matches ===
29 March 1942

Grasshopper Club	2–1	Lausanne-Sport
Goal	Summary	Goal

Hardturm, Zürich

29 March 1942
15:00

Basel	0–0 (a.e.t.)	Grenchen
	FCB summary

Stadion Rankhof, Basel
Attendance: 10,000
Referee: (Switzerland) Josef Schürch (Winterthur)
- Note: Grenchen had only ten players from the 48th minute onwards, due to an injury to Tanner.

4 April 1942
17:30
Replay

Grenchen	0–2	Basel
	FCB summary	19' (1:0) Suter; 53' (2:0) Suter

Gurzelen Stadion, Biel/Bienne
Attendance: 5,500
Referee: (Switzerland) William Bangerter (La Chaux-de-Fonds)

== Final ==
The final was traditionally held in the capital Bern, at the former Wankdorf Stadium, on Easter Monday. The replay was then played on Whit Monday.

=== Summary ===
Team 1	Score	Team 2
6 April 1942
Grasshopper Club	0–0	Basel

Replay

Team 1	Score	Team 2
25 May 1942
Grasshopper Club	3–2	Basel

=== Telegram ===
6 April 1942
15:00

Grasshopper Club	0–0 (a.e.t.)	Basel
	Fussball-Schweiz summary FCB summary

Wankdorf Stadium, Bern
Attendance: 12,000
Referee: (Switzerland) Grassi (Balerna)

25 May 1942
15:00
Replay

Grasshopper Club	3–2	Basel
Grubenmann 46' (1:2); Grubenmann 52' (2:2); Neukom 71'	Fussball-Schweiz summary FCB summary	15' (1:0) Schmidlin; 37' (2:0) Schmidlin

Wankdorf Stadium, Bern
Attendance: 14,000
Referee: (Switzerland) Jean Lutz (Genève)

Grasshopper Club won the cup and this was the club's ninth cup title to this date. Three weeks later the team also won the Swiss league championship and thus secured themselves the double. This was the club's third time in their history that they had achieved the double to this date. At that time, Basel played in the second highest league (1. Liga) and achieved promotion to the Nationalliga at the end of the season.

== Further in Swiss football ==
- 1941–42 Nationalliga
- 1941–42 Swiss 1. Liga

== Sources ==
- Fussball-Schweiz
- FCB Cup games 1941–42 at fcb-achiv.ch
- Switzerland 1941–42 at RSSSF

Preceded by 1940–41	Swiss Cup seasons	Succeeded by 1942–43
