= 1942–43 Swiss 1. Liga =

1. Liga
- Season: 1942–43
- Champions: 1. Liga champions: La Chaux-de-Fonds; Group West winners: La Chaux-de-Fonds; Group East winners: Bellinzona
- Promoted: La Chaux-de-Fonds
- Relegated: Group West: Dopolavoro Genève; Monthey; Group East: Blue Stars
- Matches: 156 (West), 132 (East); 1 decider plus 2 play-offs and 3 play-outs

The 1942–43 1. Liga season was the 11th season of the 1. Liga since its creation in 1931. At this time, the 1. Liga was the second-tier of the Swiss football league system.

== Overview ==
=== Preamble ===
In Switzerland during the second world war period, sport became an integral part of the "spiritual national defense". This was a political and cultural movement that had already become increasingly important during the late 1930s. Politicians, intellectuals and media professionals had increasingly called for measures to strengthen Switzerland's basic cultural values. Since the Nationalliga games were also considered to be one of the activities that seemed important for maintaining the morale of the population, the military authorities put considerably fewer obstacles in the way of the top players and leading clubs as they had during the previous World War. However, in 1941, the "Lex Zumbühl", named after the Swiss Football Association (ASF/SFV) president, formally banned professional football players. In addition to this, the number of foreign players allowed to play had been reduced from three to one per team.

=== Format ===
There were 25 clubs competing in the 1. Liga this season. The teams were divided into two regional groups, the eastern group with 12 teams, the western group with 13 teams. Within each group, the teams would play a double round-robin to decide their league position. Two points were awarded for a win and one point was awarded for a draw. The two group winners then contested a play-off to decide the 1. Liga championship and promotion to the top-tier. The last placed team in each group were directly relegated to the 2. Liga (third tier) and the two second last teams played a play-out against the third and final relegation slot.

== Group West ==
=== Teams, locations ===
Club	Based in	Canton	Stadium	Capacity
US Bienne-Boujean	Biel/Bienne	Bern		
CA Genève	Geneva	Geneva		
SC Derendingen	Derendingen	Solothurn	Heidenegg	1,500
Dopolavoro Genève	Genève	Geneva		
FC Étoile-Sporting	La Chaux-de-Fonds	Neuchâtel	Les Foulets / Terrain des Eplatures	1,000 / 500
FC Fribourg	Fribourg	Fribourg	Stade Universitaire	9,000
FC La Chaux-de-Fonds	La Chaux-de-Fonds	Neuchâtel	Centre Sportif de la Charrière	10,000
FC Monthey	Monthey	Valais	Stade Philippe Pottier	1,800
FC Montreux-Sports	Montreux	Vaud	Stade de Chailly	1,000
FC Renens	Renens	Vaud	Zone sportive du Censuy	2,300
FC Solothurn	Solothurn	Solothurn	Stadion FC Solothurn	6,750
Urania Genève Sport	Genève	Geneva	Stade de Frontenex	4,000
Vevey Sports	Vevey	Vaud	Stade de Copet	4,000

=== Final league table ===
Pos	Team	Pld	W	D	L	GF	GA	GD	Pts	Qualification or relegation
1	FC La Chaux-de-Fonds	24	21	2	1	92	17	+75	44	To promotion play-off
2	Urania Genève Sport	24	16	4	4	65	25	+40	36	
3	SC Derendingen	24	13	5	6	60	37	+23	31	
4	FC Étoile-Sporting	24	12	5	7	62	43	+19	29	
5	FC Renens	24	10	5	9	46	44	+2	25	
6	FC Fribourg	24	9	5	10	34	39	−5	23	
7	Vevey Sports	24	9	4	11	53	53	0	22	
8	FC Montreux-Sports	24	8	4	12	41	52	−11	20	
9	US Bienne-Boujean	24	7	4	13	38	51	−13	18	
10	CA Genève	24	8	2	14	30	68	−38	18	
11	FC Solothurn	24	6	5	13	33	54	−21	17	
12	FC Monthey	24	5	5	14	34	69	−35	15	Play-out against relegation
13	Dopolavoro Genève	24	5	4	15	26	62	−36	14	Relegation to 2. Liga

Source: RSSSF
Rules for classification: 1) Points; 2) Goal difference within the league, but decider play-off for qualifiers.

== Group East ==
=== Teams, locations ===
Club	Based in	Canton	Stadium	Capacity
FC Aarau	Aarau	Aargau	Stadion Brügglifeld	9,240
AC Bellinzona	Bellinzona	Ticino	Stadio Comunale Bellinzona	5,000
FC Bern	Bern	Bern	Stadion Neufeld	14,000
FC Birsfelden	Birsfelden	Basel-Landschaft	Sternenfeld	9,400
FC Blue Stars Zürich	Zürich	Zürich	Hardhof	1,000
SC Brühl	St. Gallen	St. Gallen	Paul-Grüninger-Stadion	4,200
FC Chiasso	Chiasso	Ticino	Stadio Comunale Riva IV	4,000
FC Concordia Basel	Basel	Basel-Stadt	Stadion Rankhof	7,000
FC Helvetia Bern	Bern	Bern	Spitalacker, Bern	1,000
FC Locarno	Locarno	Ticino	Stadio comunale Lido	5,000
US Pro Daro	Bellinzona	Ticino	Campo Geretta / Stadio Comunale Bellinzona	500 / 5,000
SC Zug	Zug	Zug	Herti Allmend Stadion	6,000

=== Final league table ===
Pos	Team	Pld	W	D	L	GF	GA	GD	Pts	Qualification or relegation
1	AC Bellinzona	22	16	2	4	51	21	+30	34	To promotion play-off
2	FC Bern	22	15	0	7	63	28	+35	30	
3	SC Zug	22	9	5	8	37	28	+9	23	
4	SC Brühl	22	10	3	9	34	28	+6	23	
5	FC Locarno	22	10	2	10	33	42	−9	22	
6	US Pro Daro	22	8	6	8	27	37	−10	22	
7	FC Chiasso	22	9	2	11	36	42	−6	20	
8	FC Birsfelden	22	7	6	9	24	38	−14	20	
9	FC Aarau	22	8	2	12	34	41	−7	18	
10	FC Helvetia Bern	22	5	8	9	32	45	−13	18	
11	FC Concordia Basel	22	7	3	12	33	41	−8	17	To decider for eleventh place
12	FC Blue Stars Zürich	22	7	3	12	29	42	−13	17	To decider for eleventh place

Source: RSSSF
Rules for classification: 1) Points; 2) Goal difference within the league, but decider play-off for qualifiers.

=== Decider for eleventh place ===
The decider was played on 18 July.

Team 1	Score	Team 2
Concordia	2–1	Blue Stars

Concordia won and continued in the play-outs. Blue Stars were relegated directly to 2. Liga Interregional.

== Promotion, relegation ==
The two group winners played a two legged tie for the title of 1. Liga champions and for promotion to the 1943–44 Nationalliga. The games were played on 6 and 20 June 1943.

=== Promotion play-off ===
Team 1	Score	Team 2
La Chaux-de-Fonds	1–1	Bellinzona
Bellinzona	1–2	La Chaux-de-Fonds

La Chaux-de-Fonds won the championship title and were promoted to the top-tier. Bellinzona remained in the division for the next season.

=== Relegation play-out ===
The two second last placed teams from each group played a two legged tie to decide the third and last relegation slot. The games were played on 25 July and 1 August 1943.

Team 1	Score	Team 2
Concordia	1–1	Monthey
Monthey	0–0	Concordia

The teams were equal, two draws each and a replay was required. This was played on 8 August at the Stadion Neufeld in Bern.

Team 1	Score	Team 2
Concordia	1–0	Monthey

Concordia won and remained in the division for the next season. Monthey were relegated to 2. Liga.

== Further in Swiss football ==
- 1942–43 Nationalliga
- 1942–43 Swiss Cup

== Sources ==
- Switzerland 1942–43 at RSSSF

Preceded by 1941–42	Seasons in Swiss 1. Liga	Succeeded by 1943–44
