= 1941–42 Nationalliga =

Swiss football season

Nationalliga
- Season: 1941–42
- Dates: 31 August 1941 to 28 June 1942
- Champions: Grasshopper Club
- Relegated: La Chaux-de-Fonds
- Matches: 182
- Goals: 658 (3.62 per match)
- Top goalscorer: Alessandro Frigerio (Lugano); 31 goals

1. Liga
- Season: 1941–42
- Champions: 1. Liga champions: Basel; Group West: Bern; Group East: Basel
- Promoted: Basel
- Relegated: Group West: Forward Morges; Group East: Schaffhausen; Juventus Zürich
- Matches: 156 (West), 132 (East) plus 2 play-offs and 3 play-outs

The following is the summary of the Swiss National League in the 1941–42 football season. This was the 45th season of top-tier and the 44th season of second-tier football in Switzerland.

== Overview ==
=== Preamble ===
In Switzerland during the second world war, sport became an integral part of the "spiritual national defense". This was a political and cultural movement that had already become increasingly important during the late 1930s. Politicians, intellectuals and media professionals had increasingly called for measures to strengthen Switzerland's basic cultural values. Since the Nationalliga games were also considered to be one of the activities that seemed important for maintaining the morale of the population, the military authorities put considerably fewer obstacles in the way of the top players as they had during the previous World War.

The Swiss Football Association (ASF/SFV) took advantage of this situation and expanded. It now had 14 member clubs that played in the top-tier, which was two more than in the previous season. The second-tier now had 25 members, which was one more than last season, and these teams were divided into two regional groups, as opposed to three groups as previously. However, in 1941, the "Lex Zumbühl", named after the Football Association's president, formally banned professional football players. In addition to this, the number of foreign players allowed to play was reduced from three to one per team.

=== Format ===
The 14 top-tier teams played a double round-robin to decide their league table positions. Two points were awarded for a win and one point was awarded for a draw. There had been no relegation last season, therefore this season the Nationalliga was contested by all 12 teams from the 1940–41 Nationalliga and the two newly promoted FC Zürich and Cantonal Neuchâtel. The first placed team at the end of the season would become Swiss champions and the last placed team would be relegated to the 1942–43 1. Liga.

The 14-team league, in which the Swiss champion was determined in 13 home and away rounds, was to prove to be the ideal solution, at least for the next three decades. This format was to remain the valid formula until 1976.

== Nationalliga ==
The league season began with the first matchday on 31 August 1941 and was concluded with the last round on 28 June 1942. However, there was one outstanding match which was played on 12 July.

=== Teams, locations ===
| Team | Based in | Canton | Stadium | Capacity |
|---|---|---|---|---|
| FC Biel-Bienne | Biel/Bienne | Bern | Stadion Gurzelen | 5,500 |
| FC Cantonal Neuchâtel | Neuchâtel | Neuchâtel | Stade de la Maladière | 25,500 |
| Grasshopper Club Zürich | Zürich | Zürich | Hardturm | 20,000 |
| FC Grenchen | Grenchen | Solothurn | Stadium Brühl | 15,100 |
| FC La Chaux-de-Fonds | La Chaux-de-Fonds | Neuchâtel | Centre Sportif de la Charrière | 12,700 |
| FC Lausanne-Sport | Lausanne | Vaud | Pontaise | 30,000 |
| FC Lugano | Lugano | Ticino | Cornaredo Stadium | 6,330 |
| FC Luzern | Lucerne | Lucerne | Stadion Allmend | 25,000 |
| FC Nordstern Basel | Basel | Basel-Stadt | Rankhof | 7,600 |
| Servette FC | Geneva | Geneva | Stade des Charmilles | 27,000 |
| FC St. Gallen | St. Gallen | St. Gallen | Espenmoos | 11,000 |
| BSC Young Boys | Bern | Bern | Wankdorf Stadium | 56,000 |
| FC Young Fellows | Zürich | Zürich | Utogrund | 2,850 |
| FC Zürich | Zürich | Zürich | Letzigrund | 25,000 |

=== Final league table ===
| Pos | Team | Pld | W | D | L | GF | GA | GD | Pts | Qualification or relegation |
|---|---|---|---|---|---|---|---|---|---|---|
| 1 | Grasshopper Club | 26 | 14 | 8 | 4 | 63 | 23 | +40 | 36 | To play-off for championship and Swiss Cup winners |
| 2 | Grenchen | 26 | 16 | 4 | 6 | 56 | 23 | +33 | 36 | To play-off for championship |
| 3 | Servette | 26 | 16 | 3 | 7 | 75 | 41 | +34 | 35 | |
| 4 | Lugano | 26 | 12 | 8 | 6 | 55 | 36 | +19 | 32 | |
| 5 | Zürich | 26 | 13 | 5 | 8 | 67 | 63 | +4 | 31 | |
| 6 | Young Fellows | 26 | 11 | 7 | 8 | 37 | 36 | +1 | 29 | |
| 7 | Lausanne-Sport | 26 | 11 | 3 | 12 | 48 | 43 | +5 | 25 | |
| 8 | St. Gallen | 26 | 10 | 4 | 12 | 40 | 62 | −22 | 24 | |
| 9 | BSC Young Boys | 26 | 7 | 9 | 10 | 38 | 41 | −3 | 23 | |
| 10 | Cantonal Neuchâtel | 26 | 9 | 3 | 14 | 52 | 60 | −8 | 21 | |
| 11 | Nordstern Basel | 26 | 7 | 7 | 12 | 30 | 48 | −18 | 21 | |
| 12 | Luzern | 26 | 5 | 8 | 13 | 26 | 54 | −28 | 18 | |
| 13 | Biel-Bienne | 26 | 7 | 3 | 16 | 39 | 76 | −37 | 17 | |
| 14 | La Chaux-de-Fonds | 26 | 6 | 4 | 16 | 30 | 50 | −20 | 16 | Relegated to 1942–43 1. Liga |

Source: rsssf.com
Rules for classification: 1) Points; 2) Goal difference within the league, however with play-off for qualifiers;

=== Results ===
| Home \ Away | BB | CAN | CDF | GCZ | GRE | LS | LUG | LUZ | NOR | SER | STG | YB | YFZ | ZÜR |
|---|---|---|---|---|---|---|---|---|---|---|---|---|---|---|
| Biel-Bienne | | 1–6 | 2–0 | 0–5 | 0–4 | 1–3 | 0–0 | 1–2 | 3–0 | 0–6 | 4–2 | 3–2 | 4–0 | 3–4 |
| Cantonal Neuchâtel | 4–0 | | 2–0 | 2–3 | 3–1 | 1–4 | 1–3 | 4–1 | 1–3 | 3–1 | 1–1 | 1–2 | 3–1 | 2–3 |
| La Chaux-de-Fonds | 1–2 | 2–3 | | 1–1 | 0–0 | 1–2 | 0–4 | 3–0 | 2–2 | 4–0 | 2–0 | 0–1 | 3–2 | 4–1 |
| Grasshopper Club | 4–0 | 3–1 | 2–0 | | 0–1 | 2–1 | 2–0 | 3–0 | 3–0 | 4–0 | 1–2 | 1–1 | 1–3 | 2–2 |
| Grenchen | 3–0 | 4–2 | 4–0 | 0–0 | | 2–1 | 3–2 | 2–1 | 4–0 | 3–4 | 5–0 | 2–0 | 4–0 | 1–1 |
| Lausanne-Sports | 3–1 | 1–2 | 0–2 | 2–1 | 1–0 | | 1–3 | 5–0 | 0–0 | 2–4 | 0–1 | 4–3 | 0–1 | 2–2 |
| Lugano | 6–1 | 5–1 | 1–0 | 1–1 | 0–2 | 4–2 | | 3–0 | 0–0 | 3–4 | 5–2 | 1–1 | 2–2 | 3–1 |
| Luzern | 2–2 | 4–1 | 1–1 | 0–2 | 1–1 | 2–0 | 0–0 | | 3–1 | 0–5 | 5–1 | 1–1 | 0–0 | 0–2 |
| Nordstern | 2–1 | 1–1 | 2–0 | 1–3 | 1–2 | 1–5 | 2–1 | 1–1 | | 0–1 | 3–1 | 1–1 | 1–0 | 2–5 |
| Servette | 1–2 | 5–2 | 5–0 | 2–2 | 2–1 | 3–4 | 1–1 | 8–0 | 3–1 | | 5–1 | 1–0 | 0–1 | 2–1 |
| St. Gallen | 3–2 | 4–1 | 4–1 | 0–6 | 0–2 | 2–1 | 1–1 | 2–1 | 1–1 | 1–4 | | 2–1 | 1–2 | 4–0 |
| Young Boys | 1–1 | 3–1 | 2–1 | 2–2 | 2–0 | 1–0 | 2–3 | 1–1 | 3–2 | 1–1 | 2–3 | | 1–1 | 1–2 |
| Young Fellows | 3–2 | 1–1 | 4–1 | 1–1 | 1–0 | 1–2 | 1–2 | 2–0 | 2–1 | 1–3 | 1–1 | 1–0 | | 1–1 |
| Zürich | 9–3 | 3–2 | 3–1 | 0–8 | 2–6 | 2–2 | 5–1 | 3–1 | 2–0 | 2–5 | 5–0 | 5–3 | 4–1 | |

Source: rsssf.com
Legend: Blue = home team win; Yellow = draw; Red = away team win.

=== Championship play-off ===
However, the first championship under the new system was not decided after the 26th matchday. Because Grasshopper Club and Grenchen ended the regular season level on points in joint first position a championship deciding match was required. The play-off took place on 19 July 1942 at the Wankdorf Stadium in Bern.

| Team 1 | Score | Team 2 |
|---|---|---|
| Grasshopper Club | 0–0 (a.e.t.) | Grenchen |

The game ended with a goalless draw after extra time, thus a replay became necessary. The replay was held on 26 July at the Rankhof in Basel.

| Team 1 | Score | Team 2 |
|---|---|---|
| Grasshopper Club | 1–1 (a.e.t.) | Grenchen |

The championship had neither been decided after the 26th matchday nor after two extra rounds. The replay in Basel also ended in a draw after 120 minutes. Since practices such as penalty shootouts or the "golden goal" were still unknown at the time, the title was awarded to the Grasshopper Club on the basis of the better goal average in the regular season. As GC had already won the Swiss Cup two months earlier, on 25 May, the team won the domestic Double in this season. This was the clubs tenth league title and their third Double to this date.

=== Topscorers ===
| Rank | Player | Nat. | Goals | Club |
|---|---|---|---|---|
| 1. | Alessandro Frigerio | (Switzerland) | 23 | Lugano |
| 2. | Fritz Knecht | (Switzerland) | 22 | Young Boys |
| 3. | Numa Monnard | (Switzerland) | 20 | Servette |

== 1. Liga ==
=== Group West ===
| Pos | Team | Pld | W | D | L | GF | GA | GD | Pts | Qualification or relegation |
|---|---|---|---|---|---|---|---|---|---|---|
| 1 | FC Bern | 24 | 19 | 1 | 4 | 60 | 30 | +30 | 39 | To promotion play-off |
| 2 | Urania Genève Sport | 24 | 18 | 2 | 4 | 57 | 24 | +33 | 38 | |
| 3 | FC Étoile-Sporting | 24 | 12 | 4 | 8 | 60 | 39 | +21 | 28 | |
| 4 | FC Fribourg | 24 | 11 | 4 | 9 | 51 | 36 | +15 | 26 | |
| 5 | US Bienne-Boujean | 24 | 11 | 4 | 9 | 53 | 43 | +10 | 26 | |
| 6 | SC Derendingen | 24 | 10 | 6 | 8 | 54 | 42 | +12 | 26 | |
| 7 | FC Solothurn | 24 | 9 | 4 | 11 | 38 | 56 | −18 | 22 | |
| 8 | CA Genève | 24 | 9 | 3 | 12 | 57 | 53 | +4 | 21 | |
| 9 | FC Montreux-Sports | 24 | 6 | 6 | 12 | 43 | 55 | −12 | 18 | |
| 10 | FC Monthey | 24 | 6 | 6 | 12 | 41 | 62 | −21 | 18 | |
| 11 | Vevey Sports | 24 | 8 | 2 | 14 | 42 | 67 | −25 | 18 | |
| 12 | Dopolavoro Genève | 24 | 7 | 3 | 14 | 30 | 59 | −29 | 17 | Play-out against relegation |
| 13 | FC Forward Morges | 24 | 5 | 5 | 14 | 37 | 57 | −20 | 15 | Relegation to 2. Liga |

Source: RSSSF
Rules for classification: 1) Points; 2) Goal difference within the league, but decider play-off for qualifiers.

=== Group East ===
| Pos | Team | Pld | W | D | L | GF | GA | GD | Pts | Qualification or relegation |
|---|---|---|---|---|---|---|---|---|---|---|
| 1 | Basel | 22 | 18 | 3 | 1 | 77 | 15 | +62 | 39 | To promotion play-off |
| 2 | Blue Stars Zürich | 22 | 15 | 4 | 3 | 50 | 25 | +25 | 34 | |
| 3 | Bellinzona | 22 | 10 | 4 | 8 | 46 | 42 | +4 | 24 | |
| 4 | FC Birsfelden | 22 | 10 | 4 | 8 | 34 | 33 | +1 | 24 | |
| 5 | Brühl St. Gallen | 22 | 9 | 6 | 7 | 40 | 37 | +3 | 24 | |
| 6 | SC Zug | 22 | 9 | 6 | 7 | 38 | 37 | +1 | 24 | |
| 7 | Locarno | 22 | 9 | 1 | 12 | 52 | 45 | +7 | 19 | |
| 8 | Chiasso | 22 | 8 | 3 | 11 | 41 | 45 | −4 | 19 | |
| 9 | Aarau | 22 | 7 | 5 | 10 | 34 | 45 | −11 | 19 | |
| 10 | Concordia Basel | 22 | 5 | 7 | 10 | 30 | 44 | −14 | 17 | |
| 11 | Schaffhausen | 22 | 3 | 6 | 13 | 29 | 64 | −35 | 12 | Play-out against relegation |
| 12 | SC Juventus Zürich | 22 | 4 | 1 | 17 | 34 | 73 | −39 | 9 | Relegation to 2. Liga |

Source: RSSSF
Rules for classification: 1) Points; 2) Goal difference within the league, but decider play-off for qualifiers.

=== Promotion play-off ===
The two group winners played a two legged tie for the title of 1. Liga champions and for promotion to the 1942–43 Nationalliga. The games were played 21 and 28 June 1942.

| Team 1 | Score | Team 2 |
|---|---|---|
| Bern | 0–0 | Basel |
| Basel | 3–1 | Bern |

Basel won the championship title and were promoted to the top-tier. Bern remained in the division for the next season.

=== Relegation play-out ===
The two second last placed teams from each group played a two legged tie to decide the third and last relegation slot. The games were played on 12 and 19 July 1942.

| Team 1 | Score | Team 2 |
|---|---|---|
| Schaffhausen | 2–3 | Dopolavoro Genève |
| Dopolavoro Genève | 1–1 | Schaffhausen |

The game Dopolavoro–Schaffhausen was nullified due to an ineligible player in the Dopolavoro team. The game was not awarded 0-3 (forfeit) but replayed on 26 July.

| Team 1 | Score | Team 2 |
|---|---|---|
| Dopolavoro Genève | 0–0 | Schaffhausen |

Dopolavoro won and remained in the division for the next season. Schaffhausen were relegated to 2. Liga.

== Further in Swiss football ==
- 1941–42 Swiss Cup
- 1941–42 Swiss 1. Liga

== Sources ==
- Switzerland 1941–42 at RSSSF

| Preceded by 1940–41 | Nationalliga seasons in Switzerland | Succeeded by 1942–43 |
