= Girolamo Lamanna =

Italian painter

Girolamo Lamanna (1580–1640) was an Italian painter. Born in Catania, Kingdom of Sicily, he was active as a painter of histories as well as a poet. He published some of his poetry with a Roman literary academy of I fantasticci
