= Santiago Lamanna =

Uruguayan footballer (born 1992)

Personal information
- Full name: Santiago Lamanna Misak
- Date of birth: 4 February 1992 (age 34)
- Place of birth: Montevideo, Uruguay
- Height: 1.72 m (5 ft 8 in)
- Position: Striker

Team information
- Current team: El Tanque Sisley
- Number: 11

Youth career
- –2010: Montevideo Wanderers

Senior career*
Years	Team	Apps	(Gls)
2010–	Montevideo Wanderers	14	(0)
2012–	→ El Tanque Sisley (loan)	32	(8)
- * Club domestic league appearances and goals as of November 17, 2013

Santiago Lamanna Misak (born 4 February 1992) is a Uruguayan footballer currently playing as a striker for El Tanque Sisley in the Uruguayan Primera División. He can also play in other positions such as winger or as a second striker.

== Club career ==
Lamanna came from the youth divisions of Montevideo Wanderers, made his professional debut with Wanderers in the 1–1 draw against Liverpool on 11 April 2010.

Lamanna was the team's captain at the 2012 Torneo di Viareggio in which they were eliminated in Group Stage.

After competing three seasons with the club and with limited opportunities in the first team, in mid 2012 he was sent on loan to Uruguayan Primera División side El Tanque Sisley. On 23 February 2013, Lamanna scored his first goal for the club against Central Español, in match in which El Tanque Sisley won 3–1.

In June 2013, he renewed his loan contract with El Tanque Sisley guaranteeing one more year with the club. He played two international matches in the 2013 Copa Sudamericana, tournament in which the club was eliminated in the first stage at hands of Chilean side Colo-Colo.

During the start of the 2013–14 season Lamanna scored the first goal in the 2–1 away win against Fénix.
