= 1942–43 Nationalliga =

Swiss football season

Nationalliga
- Season: 1942–43
- Dates: 6 September 1942 – 20 June 1943
- Champions: Grasshopper Club (12th title)
- Relegated: Nordstern Basel
- Matches: 182
- Goals: 630 (3.46 per match)
- Top goalscorer: Lauro Amadò (GC); 31 goals

The following is the summary of the Swiss National League in the 1942–43 football season. This was the 46th season of top-tier football in Switzerland.

== Overview ==
=== Preamble ===
In Switzerland during the second world war, sport became an integral part of the "spiritual national defense". This was a political and cultural movement that had already become increasingly important during the late 1930s. Politicians, intellectuals and media professionals had increasingly called for measures to strengthen Switzerland's basic cultural values. Since the Nationalliga games were also considered to be one of the activities that seemed important for maintaining the morale of the population, the military authorities put considerably fewer obstacles in the way of the top players as they had during the previous World War.

=== Format ===
The Swiss Football Association (ASF/SFV) had 14 member clubs in the top-tier at this time and the second-tier had 25 members, which were divided into two regional groups. The 14 top-tier teams played a double round-robin to decide their league table positions. Two points were awarded for a win and one point was awarded for a draw, the defeat was not awarded points. The Nationalliga was contested by the top 13 teams from the 1941–42 Nationalliga and the newly promoted, 1. Liga champions, Basel. The first placed team at the end of the season would become Swiss champions and the last placed team would be relegated to the 1943–44 1. Liga.

== Nationalliga ==
=== Teams, locations ===
Team	Based in	Canton	Stadium	Capacity
FC Basel	Basel	Basel-Stadt	Landhof	4,000
FC Biel-Bienne	Biel/Bienne	Bern	Stadion Gurzelen	5,500
FC Cantonal Neuchâtel	Neuchâtel	Neuchâtel	Stade de la Maladière	25,500
Grasshopper Club Zürich	Zürich	Zürich	Hardturm	20,000
FC Grenchen	Grenchen	Solothurn	Stadium Brühl	15,100
FC Lausanne-Sport	Lausanne	Vaud	Pontaise	30,000
FC Lugano	Lugano	Ticino	Cornaredo Stadium	6,330
FC Luzern	Lucerne	Lucerne	Stadion Allmend	25,000
FC Nordstern Basel	Basel	Basel-Stadt	Rankhof	7,600
Servette FC	Geneva	Geneva	Stade des Charmilles	27,000
FC St. Gallen	St. Gallen	St. Gallen	Espenmoos	11,000
BSC Young Boys	Bern	Bern	Wankdorf Stadium	56,000
FC Young Fellows	Zürich	Zürich	Utogrund	2,850
FC Zürich	Zürich	Zürich	Letzigrund	25,000

=== Final league table ===
Pos	Team	Pld	W	D	L	GF	GA	GD	Pts	Qualification or relegation
1	Grasshopper Club	26	19	6	1	91	22	+69	44	Swiss Champions and Swiss Cup winners
2	Lugano	26	15	5	6	67	33	+34	35	
3	Lausanne-Sport	26	15	4	7	45	36	+9	34	
4	Young Boys	26	12	7	7	46	33	+13	31	
5	Cantonal Neuchâtel	26	13	2	11	50	45	+5	28	
6	Servette	26	12	3	11	59	44	+15	27	
7	Grenchen	26	11	5	10	47	39	+8	27	
8	St. Gallen	26	12	2	12	43	53	−10	26	
9	Biel-Bienne	26	8	4	14	33	45	−12	20	
10	Young Fellows Zürich	26	6	8	12	26	43	−17	20	
11	Zürich	26	9	2	15	38	71	−33	20	
12	Luzern	26	6	6	14	31	45	−14	18	
13	Basel	26	7	4	15	29	57	−28	18	
14	Nordstern Basel	26	5	6	15	25	64	−39	16	Relegated to 1943–44 1. Liga

Source: rsssf.com
Rules for classification: 1) Points; 2) Goal difference within the league, however with play-off for qualifiers;

=== Results ===
Home \ Away	BAS	BB	CAN	GCZ	GRE	LS	LUG	LUZ	NOR	SER	STG	YB	YFZ	ZÜR
Basel		2–1	2–3	0–2	1–0	0–3	1–0	2–1	2–0	0–2	2–1	1–1	0–0	2–2
Biel-Bienne	2–1		2–0	2–3	0–1	0–1	2–3	0–1	2–2	3–0	0–1	2–2	3–2	1–0
Cantonal Neuchâtel	3–2	4–1		1–1	1–2	1–4	0–3	2–1	3–1	0–3	1–1	3–2	3–1	3–2
Grasshopper Club	6–0	1–1	2–1		2–0	8–1	6–0	4–1	5–0	5–2	3–0	4–0	1–1	11–2
Grenchen	2–1	2–4	0–1	0–0		0–0	0–5	3–1	5–1	1–1	4–2	1–1	5–0	4–1
Lausanne-Sports	2–1	2–1	2–0	3–1	2–1		3–1	0–0	1–0	5–2	1–0	0–0	2–0	3–1
Lugano	5–1	7–0	4–1	0–0	2–1	4–2		3–1	5–2	1–1	2–4	2–0	2–0	5–0
Luzern	0–3	1–1	1–3	1–1	4–4	3–0	1–0		2–1	1–3	2–0	0–1	1–2	4–0
Nordstern	0–0	0–3	1–0	8–2	0–4	2–1	1–1	0–0		1–0	3–1	1–3	4–2	0–5
Servette	9–1	5–0	1–4	1–3	3–1	1–0	2–3	2–1	3–0		0–1	2–3	0–0	4–0
St. Gallen	3–2	1–2	2–4	2–6	1–3	3–3	3–2	1–0	3–0	3–1		2–1	1–0	1–2
Young Boys	4–0	2–0	2–1	1–4	3–1	2–0	0–0	4–0	2–0	4–3	6–0		1–1	0–2
Young Fellows	3–1	1–0	1–0	0–2	1–0	2–3	1–1	0–0	2–2	1–3	1–3	1–1		1–2
Zürich	2–1	0–2	1–7	0–2	1–2	2–1	0–4	4–3	1–1	2–5	2–3	3–1	0–1	

Source: RSSSF
Legend: Blue = home team win; Yellow = draw; Red = away team win.

=== Topscorers ===
Rank	Player	Nat.	Goals	Club
1.	Lauro Amadò	(Switzerland)	31	Grasshopper Club
2.	Alessandro Frigerio	(Switzerland)	23	Lugano
3.	Willy Bernhard	(Switzerland)	21	Young Boys
4.	Marc Perroud	(Switzerland)	19	Servette
5.	Alfred Bickel	(Switzerland)	17	Grasshopper Club
6.	Fritz Knecht	(Switzerland)	15	Cantonal Neuchâtel
7.	Josef Righetti	(Switzerland)	13	Grenchen
7.	Roger Courtois	(Switzerland)	13	Lausanne-Sport
7.	Walter Bosshard	(Switzerland)	13	Zürich
10.	Mario Fornara	(Switzerland)	12	Lugano
10.	Hans-Peter Friedländer	(Switzerland)	12	Grasshopper Club

== Further in Swiss football ==
- 1942–43 Swiss Cup
- 1942–43 Swiss 1. Liga

== Sources ==
- Switzerland 1942–43 at RSSSF

Preceded by 1941–42	Nationalliga seasons in Switzerland	Succeeded by 1943–44
