= 1937–38 French Division 2 =

5th season of the second-tier football league in France

Division 2
- Season: 1937–38

Statistics of Division 2 in the 1937–38 season.

== Overview ==
It was contested by 25 teams, and Le Havre won the championship.

== Group stage ==
=== Nord ===
| Pos | Team | Pld | W | D | L | GF | GA | GD | Pts | Qualification |
|---|---|---|---|---|---|---|---|---|---|---|
| 1 | RC Arras | 10 | 7 | 1 | 2 | 19 | 9 | +10 | 15 | Promotion group |
| 2 | US Boulogne | 10 | 5 | 3 | 2 | 21 | 13 | +8 | 13 | Promotion group |
| 3 | Olympique Dunkerque | 10 | 4 | 3 | 3 | 18 | 12 | +6 | 11 | Promotion group |
| 4 | Tourcoing | 10 | 3 | 2 | 5 | 13 | 17 | −4 | 8 | Promotion group |
| 5 | Hautmont | 10 | 3 | 1 | 6 | 15 | 22 | −7 | 7 | |
| 6 | Calais | 10 | 2 | 2 | 6 | 9 | 22 | −13 | 6 | |

Source: rsssf.com

=== Ouest ===
| Pos | Team | Pld | W | D | L | GF | GA | GD | Pts | Qualification |
|---|---|---|---|---|---|---|---|---|---|---|
| 1 | Le Havre | 8 | 6 | 1 | 1 | 21 | 7 | +14 | 13 | Promotion group |
| 2 | Stade Rennais | 8 | 3 | 3 | 2 | 15 | 12 | +3 | 9 | Promotion group |
| 3 | CA Paris | 8 | 4 | 0 | 4 | 13 | 12 | +1 | 8 | Promotion group |
| 4 | Caen | 8 | 3 | 2 | 3 | 17 | 19 | −2 | 8 | Promotion group |
| 5 | Dieppe | 8 | 1 | 0 | 7 | 10 | 26 | −16 | 2 | |

Source: rsssf.com

=== Est ===
| Pos | Team | Pld | W | D | L | GF | GA | GD | Pts | Qualification |
|---|---|---|---|---|---|---|---|---|---|---|
| 1 | Nancy | 12 | 8 | 0 | 4 | 38 | 17 | +21 | 16 | Promotion group |
| 2 | Colmar | 12 | 7 | 1 | 4 | 28 | 11 | +17 | 15 | Promotion group |
| 3 | Stade Reims | 12 | 7 | 1 | 4 | 31 | 24 | +7 | 15 | Promotion group |
| 4 | Mulhouse | 12 | 6 | 1 | 5 | 21 | 23 | −2 | 13 | Promotion group |
| 5 | Charleville | 12 | 4 | 3 | 5 | 22 | 20 | +2 | 11 | |
| 6 | AS Troyes | 12 | 4 | 2 | 6 | 30 | 28 | +2 | 10 | |
| 7 | Longwy | 12 | 2 | 0 | 10 | 11 | 58 | −47 | 4 | |

Source: rsssf.com

=== Sud ===
| Pos | Team | Pld | W | D | L | GF | GA | GD | Pts | Qualification |
|---|---|---|---|---|---|---|---|---|---|---|
| 1 | Saint-Étienne | 12 | 7 | 3 | 2 | 31 | 13 | +18 | 17 | Promotion group |
| 2 | Toulouse | 12 | 6 | 4 | 2 | 21 | 22 | −1 | 16 | Promotion group |
| 3 | Olympique Alès | 12 | 5 | 5 | 2 | 24 | 12 | +12 | 15 | Promotion group |
| 4 | Nice | 12 | 5 | 5 | 2 | 26 | 19 | +7 | 15 | Promotion group |
| 5 | Montpellier | 12 | 4 | 3 | 5 | 19 | 19 | 0 | 11 | |
| 6 | Girondins Bordeaux | 12 | 1 | 3 | 8 | 23 | 33 | −10 | 5 | |
| 7 | Nîmes Olympique | 12 | 1 | 3 | 8 | 12 | 38 | −26 | 5 | |

Source: rsssf.com

== Playoff ==
=== Promotion group ===
| Pos | Team | Pld | W | D | L | GF | GA | GD | Pts | Promotion or relegation |
|---|---|---|---|---|---|---|---|---|---|---|
| 1 | Le Havre | 30 | 20 | 4 | 6 | 77 | 40 | +37 | 44 | Promoted |
| 2 | Saint-Étienne | 30 | 17 | 7 | 6 | 72 | 40 | +32 | 41 | Promoted |
| 3 | Stade Rennais | 30 | 17 | 6 | 7 | 49 | 33 | +16 | 40 | |
| 4 | Colmar | 30 | 17 | 5 | 8 | 54 | 41 | +13 | 39 | |
| 5 | Olympique Dunkerque | 30 | 13 | 8 | 9 | 58 | 52 | +6 | 34 | |
| 6 | RC Arras | 30 | 12 | 8 | 10 | 46 | 43 | +3 | 32 | |
| 7 | Toulouse | 30 | 13 | 5 | 12 | 40 | 43 | −3 | 31 | |
| 8 | Nice | 30 | 11 | 7 | 12 | 53 | 50 | +3 | 29 | |
| 9 | CA Paris | 30 | 12 | 4 | 14 | 60 | 50 | +10 | 28 | |
| 10 | Stade Reims | 30 | 12 | 3 | 15 | 48 | 50 | −2 | 27 | |
| 11 | Nancy | 30 | 10 | 7 | 13 | 45 | 49 | −4 | 27 | |
| 12 | Olympique Alès | 30 | 9 | 6 | 15 | 35 | 44 | −9 | 24 | |
| 13 | US Boulogne | 30 | 10 | 4 | 16 | 49 | 66 | −17 | 24 | |
| 14 | Caen | 30 | 9 | 5 | 16 | 47 | 71 | −24 | 23 | |
| 15 | Mulhouse | 30 | 9 | 4 | 17 | 41 | 62 | −21 | 22 | |
| 16 | Tourcoing | 30 | 5 | 5 | 20 | 37 | 85 | −48 | 15 | |

Source: rsssf.com

=== Relegation group ===
| Pos | Team | Pld | W | D | L | GF | GA | GD | Pts | Promotion or relegation |
|---|---|---|---|---|---|---|---|---|---|---|
| 1 | Charleville | 16 | 8 | 3 | 5 | 29 | 33 | −4 | 19 | |
| 2 | Hautmont | 16 | 7 | 4 | 5 | 36 | 29 | +7 | 18 | |
| 3 | Girondins Bordeaux | 16 | 8 | 1 | 7 | 29 | 26 | +3 | 17 | |
| 4 | Dieppe | 16 | 8 | 1 | 7 | 27 | 33 | −6 | 17 | |
| 5 | Montpellier | 16 | 7 | 2 | 7 | 30 | 25 | +5 | 16 | |
| 6 | Longwy | 16 | 7 | 2 | 7 | 36 | 39 | −3 | 16 | |
| 7 | AS Troyes | 16 | 6 | 3 | 7 | 28 | 29 | −1 | 15 | |
| 8 | Nîmes Olympique | 16 | 5 | 4 | 7 | 24 | 23 | +1 | 14 | |
| 9 | Calais | 16 | 5 | 2 | 9 | 21 | 33 | −12 | 12 | Relegated |

Source: rsssf.com
