= Hans-Peter Friedländer =

Swiss footballer (1920-1999)

Personal information
- Date of birth: 6 November 1920
- Place of birth: Berlin
- Date of death: July 1999 (aged 78)
- Position: Forward

Senior career*
Years	Team	Apps	(Gls)
1942–1946	Grasshopper Club Zürich		
1947–1954	FC Lausanne-Sport		

International career
1942–1952	Switzerland	22	(12)
- * Club domestic league appearances and goals

Hans-Peter Friedländer (6 November 1920 – July 1999) immigrated with his family to Switzerland at the age of five. He was active as a Swiss football forward who played for Switzerland in the 1950 FIFA World Cup. He also played for Grasshopper Club Zürich and FC Lausanne-Sport.
