= FC Étoile-Sporting =

Swiss football club

Étoile-Sporting
- Full name: F.C. Étoile-Sporting
- Nickname: Étoile-Sporting
- Founded: 1898
- Ground: Les Foulets, La Chaux-de-Fonds
- Capacity: N/D
- Chairman: --
- Manager: --
- League: 2. Liga
- Website: http://www.etoile-sporting.ch/
Home colours	Away colours

Football Club Étoile-Sporting is a Swiss football club, based in La Chaux-de-Fonds. It was founded in 1898. The club plays in red shirts, black short and red socks and are currently in the 2. Liga.

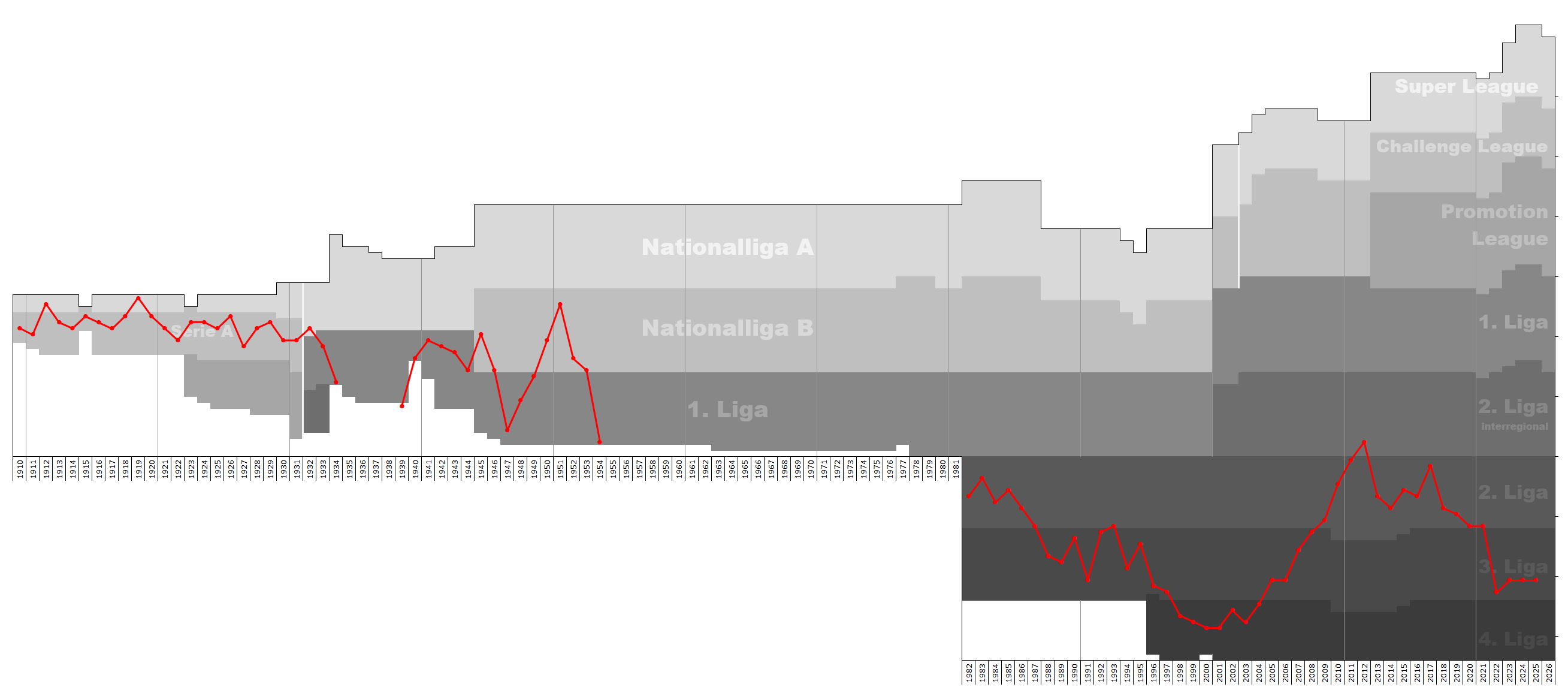
Chart of FC Etoile-Sporting table positions in the Swiss football league system

== Honours ==
- Swiss Super League
  - Winners (1): 1919
