= 1953–54 FC Basel season =

FC Basel
1953–54 season
- Chairman: Jules Düblin
- Manager: René Bader with Willy Dürr
- Ground: Landhof, Basel
- Nationalliga A: 8th
- Swiss Cup: Round 4
- Top goalscorer: League: Josef Hügi (30); All: Josef Hügi (30)
- Highest home attendance: 12,500 on 13 December 1953 vs Grasshopper Club
- Lowest home attendance: 3,500 on 28 February 1954 vs Lausanne-Sport
- Average home league attendance: 6,746

The 1953–54 season was Fussball Club Basel 1893's 60th season in their existence. It was their eighth consecutive season in the top flight of Swiss football after their promotion from the Nationalliga B the season 1945–46. They played their home games in the Landhof, in the Wettstein Quarter in Kleinbasel. Jules Düblin was the club's chairman for the eighth successive season.

== Overview ==
René Bader continued as the team's player-coach, for the second consecutive season. Basel played a total of 41 games during their 1953–54 season. Of these 41 matches 26 were in the domestic league, one match was in the Swiss Cup and 14 were test or friendly matches. The test/friendly games resulted with five victories, one was drawn, but eight matches ended with a defeat. In total, including the test games and the cup competition, 16 games were won, three were drawn and 22 were lost. In their 41 games they scored 93 goals and conceded 111. A highlight in the test games was the match on 12 June against Brazil national team. This was the last test game before the 1954 World Cup.

There were fourteen teams contesting in the 1953–54 Nationalliga A, the last two teams in the table were to be relegated. Basel won 11 of their 26 games and drew twice, but lost 13 matches. They scored 55 goals and conceded 62. Basel ended the championship with 24 points in 8th position. They were 18 points behind La Chaux-de-Fonds who became Swiss Champions. Josef Hügi was the Basel's top league goal scorer with 30 goals and thus the league top goal scorer. Walter Bielser was the team's second best goal scorer with six goals, Kurt Thalmann scored five, Hans Weber scored four.

Basel joined the Swiss Cup in the 3rd principal round with a home match in the Landhof against Grenchen. The only goal of the match fell a couple of minutes before the final whistle and Basel were knocked out of the competition in this round.

== Players ==
The following is the list of the Basel first team squad during the season 1953–54. The list includes players that were in the squad on the day that the Nationalliga A season started on 16 August 1953 but subsequently left the club after that date.

Note: Flags indicate national team as defined under FIFA eligibility rules; some limited exceptions apply. Players may hold more than one non-FIFA nationality.

No.	Pos.	Nation	Player
—	GK	SUI	Gianfranco de Taddeo (from Young Boys)
—	GK	FRA	Simon Gusothien (from AS Huningue)
—	GK	SUI	Walter Müller
—	DF	SUI	Werner Bopp
—	DF	SUI	Hans-Rudolf Fitze
—	DF	SUI	Hans Hügi (I)
—	DF	SUI	René Klauser (I)
—	DF	HUN	György Mogoy
—	DF	SUI	Hans Weber
—	MF	SUI	Walter Felber (from FC Birsfelden)
—	MF	SUI	Benedikt Frey

No.	Pos.	Nation	Player
—	MF	SUI	Kurt Maurer
—	MF	FRA	Pierre Redolfi
—	MF	SUI	Kurt Thalmann
—	FW	SUI	René Bader (Player-coach)
—	FW	SUI	Walter Bannwart
—	FW	SUI	Walter Bielser
—	FW	SUI	Josef Hügi (II)
—	FW	SUI	Ernst Klauser (II)
—	FW	ITA	Romano Zolin
—			Alfred Hartmann
—			Roman Studer
—			Werner Wederich

Players who left the squad

Note: Flags indicate national team as defined under FIFA eligibility rules; some limited exceptions apply. Players may hold more than one non-FIFA nationality.

No.	Pos.	Nation	Player
—	GK	SUI	Werner Schley (to Grasshopper Club)
—	GK	SUI	Werner Wenger

No.	Pos.	Nation	Player
—	MF	SUI	Eugen Büchel (to Young Fellows Zürich)
—	FW	SUI	Marcel Frei
—	FW	SUI	Marcel Leisinger

== Results ==
Legend

Win Draw Loss Postponed

=== Friendly matches ===
==== Pre-season and mid-season ====
21 July 1953 Pre-season	SFK Lyn Oslo (Norway)	3–3	(Switzerland) Basel	Oslo
	Muggerud (24 pen. 1:1); Nordahl 30' (2:1); Olsen 59' (3:2)	Summary	8' (0:1) Hügi (I); 57' (2:2) Maurer; 69' (3:3) Hügi (II)	Attendance: 8,000

23 July 1953 Pre-season	Hamarkameratene (Norway)	1–8	(Switzerland) Basel	Hamar
	Olsen 20' (1:1)	Summary	15' (0:1) Hügi (II); 34' (1:2) Hügi (I) (1:3) Hügi (II) (1:4) Thalmann (1:5) Thalmann (1:6) Hügi (II) (1:7) Hügi (II) (1:8) Bader

26 July 1953 Pre-season	Sjælland XI (Denmark)	6–2	(Switzerland) Basel	Roskilde
	10' (1:0) (2:1) (3:2) (4:2) (5:2) (6:2)	Summary	12' (1:1) Hügi (II); 17' (2:2) Bielser	Attendance: 2,000

28 July 1953 Pre-season	Sjælland XI (Denmark)	4–3	(Switzerland) Basel	Slagelse
	Larsen 27' (1:2); Jensen 46' (2:3); 53' (pen. 3:3); Jensen 77' (4:3)	Summary	4' (0:1) Thalmann; 18' (0:2) Bader; 41' (1:3) Hügi (II)	Attendance: 1,600

30 July 1953 Pre-season	Nykøbing Falster BK 1901 (Denmark)	3–1	(Switzerland) Basel	Nykøbing Falster
	(1:0) (2:1) (3:1)	Summary	(1:1) Bader	Attendance: 1,000

2 August 1953 Pre-season	SV Werder Bremen (Germany)	9–0	(Switzerland) Basel	Weserstadion, Bremen
	Ebert 4' (1:0); Hagenacker 10' (2:0); Hagenacker 18' (3:0); Hardtke 57' (4:0); Preusse 50' (5:0); Preusse 76' (6:0); Ebert 80' (7:0); Hagenacker 84' (8:0); Ebert 86' (9:0)	Summary

6 August 1953 Pre-seaspn	Basel (Switzerland)	0–3	(Switzerland) Young Fellows Zürich	Sports ground, Arlesheim
16:00		Summary	32' (0:1) Brühlmann; 38' (0:2) Beerli; 53' (0:3)	Referee: (Switzerland) Schaub Basel

20 September 1953 Mid-season	AS Huningue 1919 (France)	2–5	(Switzerland) Basel	Huningue
16:00	Winterberger (1:2); Keller 43' (2:4)	Summary	10' (0:1) Hügi (II); 20' (0:2) Hügi (II); 25' (1:3) Hügi (II); 40' (1:4) Hügi (II); 65' (2:5) Hügi (II)	Attendance: 2,000; Referee: (France) Moser

21 November 1953 Mid-season	Basel (Switzerland)	1–3	(Germany) Karlsruher SC	Landhof, Basel
14:45	Hügi (II) 64' (pen. 1:2)	Summary	32' (0:1) Kunkel; 62' (0:2) Kunkel; 81' (1:3) Rastetter	Attendance: 2,800; Referee: (Switzerland) W. Rufli Bremgarten

==== Winter break to end of season ====
7 February 1954 Winter break	Basel (Switzerland)	3–5	(Switzerland) Grasshopper Club	Landhof, Basel
15:00	Thalmann 35' (1:0); Bielser 61' (2:2); Hügi (II) 73' (pen. 3:2)	Summary	39' (pen. 1:1) Ballaman; 42' (1:2) Ballaman; 82' (pen. 3:3) Vonlanthen (II); 84' (3:4) Jäger; 86' (3:5) Zappia	Attendance: 1,800; Referee: (Switzerland) Kellerhals Basel

14 February 1954 Winter break	Wil (Switzerland)	1–3	(Switzerland) Basel	Lindengut, Wil
	Baltensberger 50' (1:3)	Summary	4' (0:1) Maurer; 22' (0:2) Bannwart (0:3) Hügi (II); (penalty missed) Mogoy	Attendance: 1,000; Referee: (Switzerland) Josef Gulde St. Gallen

28 March 1954 Mid-season	FC Reinach (Switzerland)	1–4	(Switzerland) Basel	Reinach
	Goal	Summary	(1x) Bannwart (1x) Hügi (II) (1x) Thalmann (1x) Weber

19 April 1954 Mid-season	Lugano (Switzerland)	2–3	(Switzerland) Basel	Al Ram, Bodio
	Poma 28' (1:0); Degiorgi 71' (2:1)	Summary	65' (1:1) Hügi (I); 80' (2:2) Hügi (II); 82' (2:3) Hügi (II)	Referee: (Switzerland) Gino Bergamini Viganello

12 June 1954 End of season	Basel (Switzerland)	2–5	Brazil	Landhof, Basel
17:30	Bosshard 27' (1:1); Weber 47' (2:2)	Summary	16' (0:1) Humberto; 43' (1:2) Humberto; 52' (2:3) Pinga; 57' (2:4) Pinga; 88' (2:5) Baltazar	Attendance: 10,000; Referee: (Switzerland) W. Rufli Bremgarten

=== Nationalliga A ===
==== League matches ====
16 August 1953 Round 1	Basel	1–0	Young Boys	Stadion Schützenmatte, Basel
16:30	Hügi (II) 23' (1:0)	Summary		Attendance: 7,500; Referee: (Switzerland) F. Buchmüller Zürich

23 August 1953 Round 2	Grasshopper Club	3–4	Basel	Hardturm, Zürich
16:00	Vukosavljević 19' (1:1); Vukosavljević 36' (2:3); Vukosavljević 54' (3:4)	Summary	12' (0:1) Bader; 31' (1:2) Hügi (II); 35' (1:3) Hügi (II); 45' (2:4) Thalmann	Attendance: 8.000; Referee: (Switzerland) Zutter Bern

30 August 1953 Round 3	Basel	4–0	Biel-Bienne	Landhof, Basel
16:30	Bader 15' (1:0); Hügi (II) 55' (2:0); Hügi (II) 60' (3:0); Bielser 79' (4:0)	Summary		Attendance: 4,500; Referee: (Switzerland) Fr. Karlen Bern

6 September 1953 Round 4	Fribourg	2–1	Basel	Stade Universitaire Saint-Léonard, Freiburg
	Raetzo 7' (1:0); Weil 75' (2:1)	Summary	11' (1:1) Hügi (II)	Attendance: 3,500; Referee: (Switzerland) Rapin Lausanne

13 September 1953 Round 5	Basel	1–3	Chiasso	Landhof, Basel
15:00	Hügi (II) 71' (1:2)	Summary	31' (o.g. 0:1) Hügi (I); 73' (0:2) Riva; 87' (1:3) Oberer	Attendance: 6,000; Referee: (Switzerland) von Gunten Bern

27 September 1953 Round 6	Lausanne-Sport	5–2	Basel	Olympique de la Pontaise, Lausanne
15:30	Maillard (II) 53' (1:1); Guhl 62' (2:1); Guhl 65' (3:1); Glisovic 70' (4:1); Stäuble 80' (5:2)	Summary	1' (0:1) Thalmann; 75' (4:2) Hügi (II)	Attendance: 7,500; Referee: (Switzerland) Schüttel Sion

4 October 1953 Round 7	Basel	3–1	FC Bern	Landhof, Basel
15:00	Mogoy 43' (pen. 1:0); Bielser 47' (2:0); Thalmann 75' (3:1)	Summary	69' (2:1) Hartmann	Attendance: 4,500; Referee: (Switzerland) E. Guidi Bellinzona

18 October 1953 Round 8	Zürich	1–2	Basel	Letzigrund, Zürich
15:00	Rossi (2:1)	Summary	20' (0:1) Hügi (I); 40' (0:2) Bannwart	Attendance: 10,000; Referee: (Switzerland) Victor Werner Schicker Bern

25 October 1953 Round 9	Basel	4–3	Grenchen	Landhof, Basel
15:00	Hügi (I) 12' (1:1); Hügi (II) (2:1); Hügi (I) 53' (3:3); Hügi (II) 58' (4:3)	Summary	7' (0:1) Righetti (II); 25' (2:2) Righetti (II); 52' (2:3) Righetti (II)	Attendance: 6,000; Referee: (Switzerland) Schönholzer Lausanne

1 November 1953 Round 10	La Chaux-de-Fonds	2–0	Basel	Stade Charrière, La Chaux-de-Fonds
15:00	Coutaz 20' (1:0); Coutaz 89' (2:0)	Summary	(yellow card) 15' Hügi (II)	Attendance: 7,500; Referee: (Switzerland) Paul Wyssling Zürich

8 November 1953 Round 11	Basel	3–2	Bellinzona	Landhof, Basel
14:30	Bielser 14' (1:0); Hügi (II) 42' (2:2); Bannwart 83' (3:2)	Summary	33' (o.g. 1:1) Mogoy; 38' (1:2) Zurmühle	Attendance: 6,000; Referee: (Switzerland) Zutter Bern

15 November 1953 Round 12	Basel	1–2	Luzern	Landhof, Basel
14:30	Hügi (II) 19' (1:0)	Summary	52' (1:1) Feller; 59' (1:2) Kruppa	Attendance: 8,000; Referee: (Switzerland) Gino Bergamini Viganello

29 November 1953 Round 13	Servette	2–2	Basel	Charmilles Stadium, Geneva
14:30	Duret 22' (1:0); Duret 52' (2:1)	Summary	41' (1:1) Thalmann (2:2) Hügi (II)	Attendance: 11,000; Referee: (Switzerland) W. Rufli Bremgarten

6 December 1953 Round 14	Young Boys	3–0	Basel	Wankdorf Stadium, Bern
14:30	Meier 17' (1:0); Grütter 61' (2:0); Meier 62' (3:0)	Summary		Attendance: 7,500; Referee: (Switzerland) Paul Wyssling Zürich

13 December 1953 Round 15	Basel	1–6	Grasshopper Club	Landhof, Basel
14:30	Mogoy 21' (1:1)	Summary	8' (0:1) Vonlanthen; 31' (1:2) Bickel; 34' (pen. 1:3) Bickel; 47' (1:4) Vuko; 60' (1:5) Bickel; 77' (1:6) Hagen	Attendance: 12,500; Referee: (Switzerland) Josef Gulde St. Gallen

20 December 1953 Round 16	Biel-Bienne	2–1	Basel	Gurzelen Stadion, Biel/Bienne
	Lipps 17' (1:0); Scheurer 60' (2:1); Wiedmer (penalty missed)	Summary	20' (1:1) Hügi (II)	Attendance: 2,500; Referee: (Switzerland) Schüttel Sion

27 December 1953 Round 17	Basel	3–2	Fribourg	Landhof, Basel
14:30	Bielser 24' (1:1); Hügi (II) 62' (2:1); Bielser 63' (3:1)	Summary	11' (0:1) Raetzo; 72' (3:2) Streiner	Attendance: 4,000; Referee: (Switzerland) Bollinger Schaffhausen

21 February 1954 Round 18	Chiasso	3–5	Basel	Stadio Via Comacini, Chiasso
	Chiesa 6' (1:0); Chiesa 8' (2:0); Ferrari 10' (3:0)	Summary	24' (3:1) Weber; 54' (3:2) Weber; 55' (3:3) Hügi (II); 63' (3:4) Hügi (II); 88' (3:5) Bannwart	Attendance: 2,500; Referee: (Switzerland) W. Rufli Bremgarten

28 February 1954 Round 19	Basel	2–3	Lausanne-Sport	Landhof, Basel
15:00	Hügi (II) 17' (1:0); Weber (2:3)	Summary	19' (1:1) Maillard (II); 46' (1:2) Eschmann; 47' (1:3) Eschmann	Attendance: 3,500; Referee: (Switzerland) Victor Werner Schicker Bern

7 March 1954 Round 20	FC Bern	2–2	Basel	Neufeld, Bern
15:00	Hügi (II) 60' (1:0); Thalmann 61' (2:0)	Summary	74' (2:1) Grossenbacher; 74' (2:2) Wirsching	Attendance: 3,500; Referee: (Switzerland) Weiersmüller Suhr

14 March 1954 Round 21	Basel	3–4	Zürich	Landhof, Basel
15:00	Hügi (II) 9' (1:0); Hügi (II) 23' (pen. 2:2); Hügi (II) 78' (3:3)	Summary	31' (pen. 2:1) Kohler; 54' (o.g. 2:2) Klauser (I); 67' (2:3) Schneiter; 80' (3:4) Bosshard	Attendance: 5,500; Referee: (Switzerland) Werner Müller

21 March 1954 Round 22	Grenchen	2–1	Basel	Stadion Brühl, Grenchen
15:00	Sidler 35' (pen. 1:0); Pfister 90' (2:1)	Summary	54' (1:1) Weber	Attendance: 4,000; Referee: (Switzerland) Fr. Karlen Bern

4 April 1954 Round 23	Basel	4–2	La Chaux-de-Fonds	Landhof, Basel
15:00	Hügi (II) 1' (pen. 1:0); Bielser 15' (2:0); Hügi (II) 43' (3:2); Hügi (II) 75' (4:2)	Summary	18' (2:1) Fesselet; 35' (2:2) Coutaz	Attendance: 4,000; Referee: (Switzerland) F. Buchmüller Zürich

11 April 1954 Round 24	Bellinzona	2–0	Basel	Stadio Comunale, Bellinzona
	Sartori 61' (1:0); Fontana 64' (2:0)	Summary		Attendance: 2,500; Referee: (Switzerland) Dörflinger Grenchen

2 May 1954 Round 25	Luzern	2–3	Basel	Stadion Allmend, Luzern
	Kyd 18' (1:0); Kyd 51' (2:2)	Summary	37' (1:1) Hügi (II); 43' (1:2) Hügi (II); 75' (2:3) Hügi (II)	Attendance: 6,000; Referee: (Switzerland) Schönholzer Lausanne

9 May 1954 Round 26	Basel	2–3	Servette	Landhof, Basel
15:00	Hügi (II) 70' (1:2); Hügi (II) 73' (2:2)	Summary	44' (0:1) Fatton; 53' (0:2) Fatton; 83' (2:3) Fatton	Attendance: 7,700; Referee: (Switzerland) Gino Bergamini Viganello

==== League table ====
Pos	Team	Pld	W	D	L	GF	GA	GD	Pts	Qualification
1	La Chaux-de-Fonds	26	20	2	4	78	36	+42	42	Champions and Swiss Cup winners
2	Grasshopper Club	26	19	3	4	108	47	+61	41	
3	Lausanne-Sport	26	15	6	5	69	46	+23	36	
4	Young Boys	26	13	4	9	66	44	+22	30	
5	Servette	26	10	10	6	55	38	+17	30	
6	Bellinzona	26	10	5	11	41	44	−3	25	
7	Grenchen	26	10	4	12	53	58	−5	24	
8	Basel	26	11	2	13	55	62	−7	24	
9	Chiasso	26	9	5	12	45	62	−17	23	
10	Luzern	26	10	2	14	47	68	−21	22	
11	Zürich	26	8	4	14	45	64	−19	20	
12	Fribourg	26	8	2	16	37	53	−16	18	
13	FC Bern	26	8	1	17	40	75	−35	17	Relegated
14	Biel-Bienne	26	5	2	19	36	78	−42	12	Relegated

Source: rsssf.com

=== Swiss Cup ===
10 January 1954 Round 3	Basel	0–1	Grenchen	Landhof, Basel
14:30		Summary	88' (0:1) Pfister	Attendance: 5,200; Referee: (Switzerland) Gino Bergamini Viganello

== See also ==
- History of FC Basel
- List of FC Basel players
- List of FC Basel seasons

== Sources ==
- Die ersten 125 Jahre. Publisher: Josef Zindel im Friedrich Reinhardt Verlag, Basel. ISBN 978-3-7245-2305-5
- The FCB team 1953–54 at fcb-archiv.ch
- Switzerland 1953–54 by Erik Garin at Rec.Sport.Soccer Statistics Foundation
