= 1951–52 FC Basel season =

FC Basel
1951–52 season
- Chairman: Jules Düblin
- Manager: Ernst Hufschmid
- Ground: Landhof, Basel
- Nationalliga A: 4th
- Swiss Cup: Semi-final
- Top goalscorer: League: Josef Hügi (24); All: Josef Hügi (32)
- Highest home attendance: 10,000 on 23 September 1951 vs Lugano and on 7 October 1951 vs Grasshopper Club
- Lowest home attendance: 3,000 on 9 December 1951 vs Bellinzona and on 30 March 1952 vs Locarno
- Average home league attendance: 6,292

The 1951–52 season was Fussball Club Basel 1893's 58th season in their existence. It was their sixth season in Nationalliga A the top flight of Swiss football following their promotion from the Nationalliga B in the season 1945–46. Basel played their home games in the Landhof, in the Quarter Kleinbasel. Jules Düblin was the club's chairman for the sixth successive season.

== Overview ==
Ernst Hufschmid, who had functioned as player-coach the previous four seasons, continued as team manager this season. Basel played a total of 42 games in this season. Of these 26 games were in the domestic league, five games were in the Swiss Cup and eleven were test games. The test games resulted with four victories, two were drawn and five ended with defeats. In total, including the test games and the cup competition, they won 22 games, drew five and lost 15 times. In the 42 games they scored 123 and conceded 87 goals.

The newly built stadium Landhof was opened on the weekend of 18 and 19 August 1951. There were larger spectator stands, new meeting rooms, changing rooms and a brand new restaurant. The buildings had cost 700,000 Swiss Francs and had taken two years to complete, during this time the team had to play all their games at the Stadion Schützenmatte. The pitch had been newly laid out and its opening was accompanied by a two-day international football tournament, competed by Austrian team First Vienna, French team Sochaux-Montbéliard and Swiss teams Grasshopper Club Zürich. On both days there were over six thousand people celebrating the big party, even though their team lost 2–3 against Vienna and even 1–7 against Sochaux. It was a big hope that these new conditions would also change the fortunes of the club to the better, because nearly 60 years had passed since the club's foundation without a championship. The Basel fans were becoming frustrated, because 36 of the first 52 championships had gone to the cities of Zürich, Geneva or Bern. Even small towns such as Aarau, Neuchâtel, La Chaux-de-Fonds, Lugano, Bellinzona, Biel/Bienne, Winterthur and St. Gallen had been able to celebrate a championship. The championship had still had never been won by a team from Basel.

As in the previous seasons, there were fourteen teams contesting in the 1951–52 Nationalliga A and the bottom two teams in the league table were to be relegated. Basel played a good start to the season. They won the first six games straight off. But they lost four of the next five games and slipped in the league table. However, winning the last three games before and the first three games after the winter break, they were again in contention for the league championship. Suddenly, towards the end of the season, they lost five games in a row and lost contact to the table top. At the end of the season Basel finished in fourth position, seven points behind the new champions Grasshopper Club. The hopeful fans were again frustrated by this fact. The team Basel had won 14 games, drew three games and were defeated nine times. The team scored 68 goals and conceded 47 as they obtained their 31 points. Josef "Seppe" Hügi was the team's and the league's best goal scorer with 24 league goals. Walter Bannwart was the team's second-best goal getter with 10 goals. Paul Stöcklin scored nine times, René Bader and Hans Hügi both scored seven times.

Basel started in the 3rd principal round of the Swiss Cup on 4 November 1951 with a home game against lower tier Wettingen and won 7–0. In the next round against Nationalliga A team Locarno they won 3–2 and again in the following round against Nationalliga A team Chiasso by three goals to one. In the quarter finals Basel beat Servette and faced Grasshopper Club in the semi-final. The Grasshoppers won this game in the Landhof and progressed to the final, in which they beat Lugano and thus won the double.

== Players ==
The following is the list of the Basel first team squad during the season 1950–51. The list includes players that were in the squad on the day that the Nationalliga A season started on 3 September 1950 but subsequently left the club after that date.

Note: Flags indicate national team as defined under FIFA eligibility rules; some limited exceptions apply. Players may hold more than one non-FIFA nationality.

No.	Pos.	Nation	Player
—	GK	SUI	Oswald Capra
—	GK	SUI	Walter Müller
—	GK	SUI	Jean Presset
—	DF	SUI	Werner Bopp
—	DF	SUI	Hans-Rudolf Fitze
—	DF	SUI	Hans Hügi
—	DF	SUI	Marcel Pralong
—	MF	SUI	Max Sutter
—	MF	SUI	Hans Weber
—	MF	SUI	Fritz Hartmann

No.	Pos.	Nation	Player
—	MF	SUI	Kurt Maurer
—	MF	FRA	Pierre Redolfi
—	MF	SUI	Kurt Thalmann (from Concordia Basel)
—	MF	SUI	Werner Wenk
—	FW	SUI	René Bader
—	FW	SUI	Walter Bannwart
—	FW	SUI	Josef Hügi
—	FW	SUI	Marcel Leisinger
—	FW	SUI	Paul Stöcklin
—	FW	SUI	Fritz Wolf

Players who left the squad

Note: Flags indicate national team as defined under FIFA eligibility rules; some limited exceptions apply. Players may hold more than one non-FIFA nationality.

No.	Pos.	Nation	Player
—	DF	SUI	Ernst Hufschmid (Manager)
—	MF	SUI	Leo Baumgratz (to Concordia Basel)
—	MF	SUI	Eugen Müller

No.	Pos.	Nation	Player
—	MF	SUI	Gottlieb Stäuble
—	MF	SUI	Willy Zingg
—	FW	SUI	Peter Baumgartner
—	FW	SUI	Erich Grether

== Results ==
=== Legend ===
Win Draw Loss Postponed

=== Friendly matches ===
==== Pre-season ====
4 August 1951 Pre-season	SV Weil (Germany)	2–10	(Switzerland) Basel	Weil am Rhein
17:30	(1x) (1x)	Summary	(3x) Hügi (II) (3x) Weber (1x) Stöcklin (1x) Suter (1x) Thalmann (1x) Wolf

11 August 1951 Pre-season	Eimsbütteler TV (Germany)	2–0	(Switzerland) Basel	Hamburg
	Eckhoff 56' (1:0); Eckhoff 61' (2:0)	Summary

12 August 1951 Pre-season	Eintracht Braunschweig (Germany)	3–4	(Switzerland) Basel	Eintracht-Stadion, Braunschweig
	Arens (1:2); Welter (2:2); Hirschberg (3:2)	Summary	(0:1) Bannwart (0:2) Suter (3:3) Bannwart (3:4) Thalmann	Attendance: 10,000; Referee: (England) Sherman

14 August 1951 Pre-season	Travemünde (Germany)	2–8	(Switzerland) Basel	Travemünde
	Goal	Summary	(6x) Hügi (II) (2x) Suter (1x)

18 August 1951 Pre-season	Basel (Switzerland)	2–3	(Austria) First Vienna	Landhof, Basel
15:30	Hügi (II) 60' (1:2); Bader 70' (2:2)	Summary	8' (0:1) Walzhofer; 38' (o.g. 0:2); 73' (2:3) Walzhofer	Referee: (Switzerland) von Wartburg Bern

19 August 1951 Pre-season	Basel (Switzerland)	1–7	(France) Sochaux-Montbéliard	Landhof, Basel
16:50	Stöcklin (1x)	Summary	(4x) Bruat (1x) Salzborn (1x) Gardien (1x) Montagnoli	Attendance: 6,000; Referee: (Switzerland) von Wartburg Bern

==== Winter break and mid-season ====
10 February 1952 Winter break	Basel (Switzerland)	5–2	(Switzerland) Urania Genève Sport	Landhof, Basel
14:30	Bader 6' (1:1); Hügi (II) (2:1); Hügi (II) (3:1); Hügi (II) 39' (4:1); Stöcklin 83' (5:2)	Summary	(0:1) Stefano (I); 82' (4:2) Hofstettler	Attendance: 800; Referee: (Switzerland) Stuber Solothurn

9 April 1952 Mid-season	Cantonal Neuchâtel (Switzerland)	2–2	(Switzerland) Basel	Stade de Cantonal, Neuchâtel
20:30	Willi 35' (1:0); Monnard (2:1)	Summary	(1:1) Hügi (II); 90' (2:2) Hügi (II)	Attendance: 1,500; Referee: (Switzerland) Merlotti Neuchâtel

30 April 1952 Mid-season	Basel (Switzerland)	1–1	(England) Preston North End	Landhof, Basel
16:30	Hügi (II) 18' (1:0)	Summary	53' (1:1) Foster	Attendance: 6,000; Referee: (Switzerland) Andres Birsfelden

20 May 1952 Mid-season	Basel (Switzerland)	0–1	(England) Arsenal	Landhof, Basel
18:30		Summary	43' (0:1) Roper	Attendance: 9,500; Referee: (Switzerland) Rapin Lausanne

22 May 1952 Mid-season	VfR Mannheim (Germany)	5–3	(Switzerland) Basel	Aumattstadion, Baden-Baden
	Löttke 4' (1:0); Bassler 37' (2:1); Heinz 44' (3:1); Langlotz 45' (pen. 4:1); Lambert 51' (5:2)	Summary	7' (1:1) Thalmann; 50' (4:2) Hügi (II); 88' (5:3) Hügi (II)	Attendance: 5,000; Referee: (Germany) Bäzler Baden-Baden

=== Nationalliga A ===
==== League matches ====
26 August 1951 Round 1	Basel	6–1	Young Fellows Zürich	Landhof, Basel
15:00	Stöcklin 5' (pen. 1:0); Hügi (II) 29' (2:1); Hügi (II) 52' (3:1); Bader 58' (4:1); Hügi (II) 61' (5:1); Thalmann 77' (6:1)	Summary	27' (1:1) Ballaman	Attendance: 4,200; Referee: (Switzerland) Scherz Bern

2 September 1951 Round 2	Basel	3–2	Lausanne-Sport	Landhof, Basel
15:00	Bannwart 31' (1:0); Suter 42' (2:1); Hügi (II) 69' (3:1)	Summary	40' (1:1) Friedländer; 74' (3:2) Friedländer	Attendance: 7,500; Referee: (Switzerland) Armand Merlotti Neuchâtel

9 September 1951 Round 3	FC Bern	2–6	Basel	Neufeld, Bern
15:00	Wirsching 30' (1:1); Schönmann 46' (2:3)	Summary	1' (0:1) Stöcklin; 32' (1:2) Hügi (II); 34' (1:3) Bannwart; 47' (2:4) Stöcklin; 70' (2:5) Bannwart; 72' (2:6) Hügi (II)	Attendance: 4,500; Referee: (Switzerland) Josef Gulde St. Gallen

23 September 1951 Round 4	Basel	2–0	Lugano	Landhof, Basel
15:00	Bannwart 4' (1:0); Bannwart 75' (2:0)	Summary		Attendance: 10,000; Referee: (Switzerland) Willy Rufli Bremgarten

30 September 1951 Round 5	Locarno	0–2	Basel	Stadio del Lido, Locarno
		Summary	8' (0:1) Hügi (II); 50' (0:2) Bader	Attendance: 3,000; Referee: (Switzerland) von Gunten Bern

7 October 1951 Round 6	Basel	2–0	Grasshopper Club	Landhof, Basel
15:00	Hügi (II) 53' (1:0); Hügi (II) 74' (2:0)	Summary		Attendance: 10,000; Referee: (Switzerland) Armand Merlotti Neuchâtel

21 October 1951 Round 7	Zürich	2–0	Basel	Hardturm, Zürich
15:15	Rossi 5' (1:0); Lehrieder 62' (2:1); Schneiter 64' (3:1); Lehrieder 70' (4:1)	Summary	11' (1:1) Hügi (II); (yellow card) Hügi (II)	Attendance: 22,000; Referee: (Switzerland) M. Baumberger Lausanne

28 October 1951 Round 8	Basel	1–5	La Chaux-de-Fonds	Landhof, Basel
15:00	Thalmann 33' (1:0)	Summary	68' (1:1) Antenen; 69' (1:2) Morand; 83' (1:3) Morand; 86' (1:4) Morand; 90' (1:5) Peney	Attendance: 6,800; Referee: (Switzerland) Victor Werrner Schicker Bern

11 November 1951 Round 9	Servette	4–1	Basel	Charmilles Stadium, Geneva
15:00	Züfle 30' (1:0); Pasteur 36' (pen. 2:0); Fatton 57' (3:0); Züfle 85' (4:1)	Summary	60' (3:1) Thalmann	Attendance: 8,500; Referee: (Switzerland) Willy Rufli Bremgarten

18 November 1951 Round 10	Basel	3–0	Young Boys	Landhof, Basel
14:30	Hügi (II) 2' (1:0); Hügi (II) 57' (2:0); Bannwart 74' (3:0)	Summary		Attendance: 5,700; Referee: (Switzerland) Ernst Dörflinger Grenchen

2 December 1951 Round 11	Chiasso	1–0	Basel	Stadio Via Comacini, Chiasso
	Zanollo 36' (1:0)	Summary		Attendance: 3,000; Referee: (Switzerland) M. Baumberger Lausanne

9 December 1951 Round 12	Basel	4–1	Bellinzona	Landhof, Basel
14:30	Bader 10' (1:0); Stöcklin 21' (pen. 2:0); Hügi (I) 74' (3:1); Thalmann 85' (4:1)	Summary	58' (2:1) Pellanda	Attendance: 3,000; Referee: (Switzerland) Bertsche Neuhausen am Rheinfall

16 December 1951 Round 13	Biel-Bienne	0–3	Basel	Gurzelen Stadion, Biel/Bienne
14:30		Summary	6' (0:1) Hügi (II); 25' (0:2); 90' (0:3) Stöcklin	Attendance: 4,000; Referee: (Switzerland) Emilio Guidi Bellinzona

24 February 1952 Round 14	Young Fellows Zürich	0–2	Basel	Letzigrund, Zürich
14:30		Summary	14' (0:1) Bannwart; 44' (0:2) Bannwart	Attendance: 3,500; Referee: (Switzerland) von Wartburg Bern

2 March 1952 Round 15	Lausanne-Sport	1–1	Basel	Olympique de la Pontaise, Lausanne
15:00	Maurer (1:1)	Summary	10' (0:1) Hügi (I); (yellow card) Hügi (I)	Attendance: 9,000; Referee: (Switzerland) Paul Wyssling Zürich

9 March 1952 Round 16	Basel	5–1	FC Bern	Landhof, Basel
15:00	Bannwart 8' (1:0); Hügi (I) 35' (2:1); Bopp 72' (pen. 3:1); Hügi (I) 80' (4:1); Hügi (I) 83' (5:1)	Summary	13' (1:1) Just	Attendance: 4,600; Referee: (Switzerland) Fritz Buchmüller Zürich

16 March 1952 Round 17	Lugano	0–3	Basel	Cornaredo, Lugano
		Summary	14' (0:1) Hügi (II); 50' (0:2) Hügi (II); 75' (0:3) Stöcklin	Attendance: 3,000; Referee: (Switzerland) von Gunten Bern

13 March 1952 Round 18	Basel	5–3	Locarno	Landhof, Basel
15:00	Bopp 10' (pen. 1:0); Stöcklin 12' (2:0); Hügi (I) 64' (3:0); Hügi (II) 78' (4:2); Bader 81' (pen. 5:2)	Summary	65' (3:1) Santini; 68' (pen. 3:2) Ernst; 85' (o.g. 5:3)	Attendance: 3,000; Referee: (Switzerland) Zutter Bern

6 April 1952 Round 19	Grasshopper Club	2–2	Basel	Hardturm, Zürich
16:00	Vonlanthen (II) 32' (1:0); Hüssy 38' (2:0)	Summary	51' (2:1) Hügi (I); 82' (2:2) Hügi (II)	Attendance: 18,000; Referee: (Switzerland) von Gunten Bern

20 April 1952 Round 20	Basel	2–2	Zürich	Landhof, Basel
15:00	Hügi (II) 7' (1:0); Hügi (II) 63' (2:1)	Summary	15' (1:1) Schneiter; 81' (2:2) Bosshard	Attendance: 6,000; Referee: (Switzerland) Roger Rapin Lausanne

27 April 1952 Round 21	La Chaux-de-Fonds	2–1	Basel	Stade Charrière, La Chaux-de-Fonds
15:00	43' (o.g. 1:1); Sobotka 51' (2:1)	Summary	27' (0:1) Hügi (II)	Attendance: 5,000; Referee: (Switzerland) Fritz Buchmüller Zürich

4 May 1952 Round 22	Basel	0–3	Servette	Landhof, Basel
15:00	Hügi (II) (red card) 58'	Summary	33' (0:1) Kohli; 41' (0:2) Mauron; 78' (0:3) Mauron	Attendance: 7,000; Referee: (Switzerland) von Gunten Bern

11 May 1952 Round 23	Young Boys	4–3	Basel	Neufeld, Bern
15:00	Sing 6' (1:0); Häuptli 14' (2:0); Zaugg 24' (3:0); Meier 52' (4:0)	Summary	54' (4:1) Thalmann; 60' (pen. 4:2) Bader; 64' (4:3) Suter	Attendance: 5,000; Referee: (Switzerland) Louis Tschopp Delémont

18 May 1952 Round 24	Basel	1–2	Chiasso	Landhof, Basel
15:00	Weber 83' (1:2)	Summary	23' (0:1) Bianchi; 31' (0:2) 31. Zanollo	Attendance: 5,000; Referee: (Switzerland) Paul Wyssling Zürich

25 May 1952 Round 25	Bellinzona	6–2	Basel	Stadio Comunale, Bellinzona
15:00	Sartori 13' (1:0); Erba 15' (2:0); Sartori 29' (pen. 3:0); Erba 56' (4:1); Zanetti 77' (5:2); Sartori 85' (6:2)	Summary	36' (3:1) Stöcklin; 58' (4:2) Thalmann	Attendance: 1,700; Referee: (Switzerland) Zutter Bern

8 June 1952 Round 26	Basel	7–1	Biel-Bienne	Landhof, Basel
16:15	Hügi (II) 8' (1:0); Stöcklin 56' (2:1); Bader 63' (3:1); Hügi (II) 65' (4:1); Bader 67' (5:1); Bannwart 71' (6:1); Hügi (II) (7:1)	Summary	51' (1:1) Rösch	Attendance: 9,000; Referee: (Switzerland) Musch Geneva

==== League standings ====
Pos	Team	Pld	W	D	L	GF	GA	GD	Pts	Qualification
1	Grasshopper Club Zürich	26	16	6	4	79	38	+41	38	Champions and Swiss Cup winners
2	FC Zürich	26	14	9	3	61	36	+25	37	
3	FC Chiasso	26	15	5	6	59	49	+10	35	
4	FC Basel	26	14	3	9	68	47	+21	31	
5	FC La Chaux-de-Fonds	26	11	8	7	62	45	+17	30	
6	Servette FC Genève	26	11	6	9	57	45	+12	28	
7	BSC Young Boys	26	10	7	9	61	52	+9	27	
8	Lausanne Sports	26	8	9	9	39	43	−4	25	
9	AC Bellinzona	26	8	6	12	43	55	−12	22	
10	FC Locarno	26	8	6	12	41	66	−25	22	
11	FC Lugano	26	7	7	12	46	54	−8	21	
12	FC Bern	26	7	5	14	47	64	−17	19	
13	Young Fellows Zürich	26	5	5	16	36	71	−35	15	Relegated
14	FC Biel-Bienne	26	4	6	16	37	71	−34	14	Relegated

Source: rsssf.com

=== Swiss Cup ===
4 November 1951 Round 3	Basel	7–0	Wettingen	Landhof, Basel
14:30	Hügi (I) 14' (1:0); Suter 19' (2:0); Hügi (II) 22' (3:0); 49' (o.g. 4:0); Hügi (II) 54' (5:0); Stöcklin 57' (6:0); Hügi (II) 75' (7:0)	Summary	Goal	Attendance: 1,200; Referee: (Switzerland) von Wartburg Bern

23 December 1951 Round 4	Basel	3–2	Locarno	Landhof, Basel
14:30	Hügi (II) 2' (1:0); Hügi (II) 28' (2:1); Bader 84' (3:2)	Summary	6' (1:1) Ernst; 34' (2:2) Santini	Attendance: 7,500; Referee: (Switzerland) Rapin Lausanne

30 December 1951 Round 5	Basel	3–1	Chiasso	Landhof, Basel
14:30	Hügi (II) 43' (1:0); Bopp 76' (pen. 2:1); Hügi (II) 83' (3:1)	Summary	69' (1:1) Busenhart	Attendance: 8,000; Referee: (Switzerland) M. Baumberger Lausanne

17 February 1952 Quarter-final	Basel	6–5	Servette	Landhof, Basel
14:30	Bader 9' (1:0); Hügi (II) 12' (2:0); Thalmann 48' (3:4); Bader 62' (4:4); Thalmann 85' (5:5); Suter (6:5)	Summary	18' (2:1) Fatton; 22' (2:2) Züfle; 39' (2:3) Mauron; 44' (2:4) Fatton; 65' (4:5) Fatton	Attendance: 9,200; Referee: (Switzerland) Rapin Lausanne

23 March 1952 Semi-final	Basel	0–2	Grasshopper Club	Landhof, Basel
15:00		Summary	25' (0:1) Ballaman; 28' (0:2) Berbig	Attendance: 16,000; Referee: (Switzerland) Josef Gulde St. Gallen

== See also ==
- History of FC Basel
- List of FC Basel players
- List of FC Basel seasons

== Sources ==
- Die ersten 125 Jahre. Publisher: Josef Zindel im Friedrich Reinhardt Verlag, Basel. ISBN 978-3-7245-2305-5
- The FCB team 1951–52 at fcb-archiv.ch
- Switzerland 1951–52 by Erik Garin at Rec.Sport.Soccer Statistics Foundation
