= History of FC Basel (1939–1965) =

The history of FC Basel spans from its founding on 15 November 1893 to the present.

Each period has been divided into five sections. This page chronicles the history of FCB from 1939 to 1965. For details on the other periods of the club's history, see the following articles:

- History of FC Basel (1893–1939)
- History of FC Basel (1965–2000)
- History of FC Basel (2000–present)

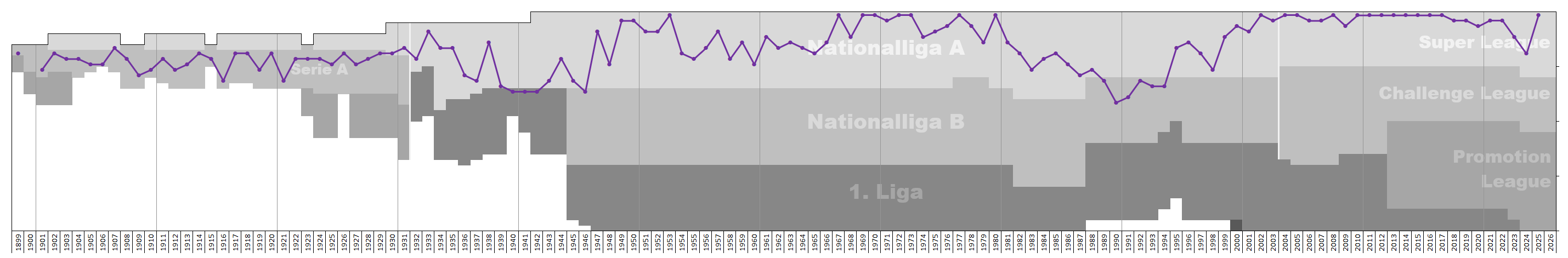
Chart of FC Basel table positions in the Swiss football league system

The Basel Coat of Arms, FC Basel's original logo

== Promotion and relegation ==
After the club's relegation at the end of the 1938–39 season, player-manager Fernand Jaccard was hired by FC Locarno. Former Basel players Walter Dietrich and Max Galler replaced Jaccard as co-managers. Basel played in the 1. Liga in the 1939–40 season, which was reorganized and shortened due to World War I and played well throughout the season; they won all six of their home matches and only lost one game, away against FC Solothurn. Basel finished first in their group and advanced to the play-off stage. After winning the round-robin semi-final against Brühl and AC Bellinzona, Basel won the final against Fribourg and were crowned champions, though were not promoted due to the war. Basel entered the Swiss Cup in the second round, winning against SC Zofingen and SC Schöftland before falling to FC Aarau.

Promotions recommenced the following season. Dietrich and Galler were replaced by Eugen Rupf as manager. Basel were allocated to the Central Group and were dominant, winning 11 of the 14 games; while they were challenged by Aarau, Basel lost just one game and won group by a single point. In the promotion playoffs against the other two groups winners, Basel lost to Cantonal Neuchatel and drew with Zürich, which placed Basel last and kept them in the 1. Liga. In the Swiss Cup, Basel defeated Old Boys and FC Allschwil before drawing with Nordstern, forcing a replay with Basel lost.

In Basel's third season in the 1. Liga, they claimed several dominant victories including 11-0 over FC Schaffhausen and 10-1 over Young Fellows Zürich. Basel finished the season with only one loss, winning the East group to set up a promotion playoff against FC Bern. Basel won 3–1 on aggregate to achieve promotion. The league success was complemented by a strong cup run: after defeating Old Boys and FC Birsfelden, Basel knocked out BSC Young Boys in an 3-0 upset and followed with a 6-1 thumping of FC Solothurn. After a draw against Lugano, the clubs could not agree on a replay date; as such, Basel progressed to the semifinals on a coin toss. Another draw occurred in Basel's semifinal against Grenchen, but Basel were victorious in a replay. A third draw occurred in the final against Grasshopper Club Zurich, but Basel's cup run would end when Grasshopper won the replay 3-2.

The 1942–43 season started badly for Basel, who lost five of the first six games. Shortly before Christmas, Basel suffered their biggest defeat of the season, a 1–9 loss to Servette. A 3–0 away game victory against Luzern and a 2–0 home game victory against Nordstern led Basel to end the season in 13th with 18 points, avoiding relegation by two points. In the Swiss Cup, Basel started in the 4th principal round with a home tie at the Landhof against lower tier local side FC Pratteln, ending with an expected easy 6–0 victory. In the round of 16 Basel had a home match against lower tier SV Schaffhausen. Hermann Suter and Fritz Schmidlin both achieved a hat-trick and Basel won 9–2. In the quarter-finals Basel were drawn at home against top tier Lugano but lost 0–2.

Team manager Eugen Rupf left the club during the 1943–44 season and Willy Wolf was appointed as Basel's new team manager. Basel had a mediocre 1943–44 Nationalliga season, finishing in ninth. In the Swiss Cup, Basel beat Nordstern Basel 4–1 and St. Gallen 6–2. The quarter-final gave Basel another home tie and they won 5–1 against Young Boys. The semi-final was an away tie against Biel-Bienne, but Basel qualified for the final against Lausanne-Sport. Basel lost the final 0–3.

Emil Junker replaced Albert Besse as the club's new chairman during the 1944–45 season and Max Barras was appointed as team manager. Basel played a bad season in the 1944–45 Nationalliga A and ended in 13th – second to last – with 18 points. Two games were played under protest that Basel could not field their best teams due to military duties of their players. The games against Lugano and Grenchen were replayed and Basel lost again. Grasshopper Club won the Swiss championship; Basel was relegated. In the Swiss Cup, Basel beat FC Allschwil 6–0 and SC Zofingen 3–1. In the round of 16 Basel travelled to a game against St. Gallen and lost. Basel played well in the next season, winning 19 league matches, drawing five and losing only two. They ended the season in first with 43 points and won promotion. In the Swiss Cup, Basel beat SC Schöftland 5–1 and won an away game against Nationalliga B team Fribourg but lost to Servette.

== Jules Düblin, chairman (1946–1959) ==
Jules Düblin became the club's new chairman during the 1946–47 season. Düblin was a player for FC Basel from 1919–1926 and had been on the club's board of directors. Anton Schall moved to Switzerland and was club trainer for Basel during the 1946–47 season. Basel finished the 1946–47 Nationalliga A season in fourth. In the Swiss Cup Basel started in round 3 with a home match against Black Stars Basel and won 3–2. In round 4 they had an away tie against La Chaux-de-Fonds and won 2–1. In round 5, Basel had another home tie in the Landhof against local club Nordstern and won 6–1, advancing to the quarter-finals. They were matched against the Grasshoppers and won 2–1. In the semi-final, goals from top scorers Traugott Oberer and René Bader gave Basel a 2–1 victory against Grenchen. Basel advanced to the Cup Final in the Stadion Neufeld in Bern and won 3–0 against Lausanne-Sport. This was their second cup title. Anton Schall died shortly afterwards during a workout on the football field. Following Anton Schall's death, captain Ernst Hufschmid took over as player-manager. The team started the 1947–48 season badly, losing six of their first eleven games in the 1947–48 Nationalliga A. With seven victories in the second half of the season the team were able to lift themselves out of the relegation zone, finishing 10th in the table. In the Swiss Cup, Basel played against SC Balerna and won 7–0. In the quarter-finals, Basel were drawn away against La Chaux-de-Fonds and lost.

Basel started the 1948–49 season badly, losing three of the first four away games in the 1948–49 Nationalliga A. In autumn, however, they lost only one of eleven matches. At the end of the season Basel had risen to second place. In the Swiss Cup, Basel started in round 3 with an away match against lower tier Winterthur and won 2–1. In round 4 Basel were drawn with an away tie against local rivals and lower tier Concordia Basel and won. In round five, Basel played Grasshopper Club with another away game. It ended in a draw, so a replay was held at the Landhof on 22 January 1949, which Basel lost. Basel started the next season well, winning six of the first seven games in the 1949–50 Nationalliga A. They lost their last two games and finished in second, two points behind Servette. Basel began the third round of the Swiss Cup with an away match against lower tier FC Porrentruy and won. In round four, Basel were drawn away against Grasshopper Club and won. In the round of 16 and the quarter-final Basel played at home and won against Wil and Bellinzona, but later lost to Lausanne-Sport.

During the 1950–51 season, Ernst Hufschmid stayed as player-coach for the fourth season in a row but only played one match. On 10 August 1950 Football Club Basel played against Eishockey Club Basel. This was a return game for the ice hockey game EHC-FCB in December 1949. The football team won the match 14–5. Basel played a mediocre season in the 1950–51 Nationalliga A and stayed around the middle of the table. Basel won their last two games and finished in fourth, tied with Zürich and Servette, six points behind the champions Lausanne-Sport. In the Swiss Cup in an away match against FC Münchenstein, Gottlieb Stäuble scored a hat-trick and the Basel won 6–0, qualifying for the next round. Basel won against Biel-Bienne in round four. In round five, Basel were drawn at home against Locarno. In the 65th minute goalkeeper Walter Müller and defender Werner Wenk were sent off and Locarno won the game.

The newly built stadium Landhof was opened on the weekend of 18 and 19 August 1951. It had larger spectator stands, new meeting rooms, changing rooms and a new restaurant. The buildings cost 700,000 Swiss Francs and took two years to complete. During its construction, the team played their games at the Stadion Schützenmatte. The pitch had been newly laid out and its opening was accompanied by a two-day international football tournament with Austrian team First Vienna, French team Sochaux-Montbéliard and Swiss team Grasshopper Club Zürich. Over six thousand fans celebrated despite Basel losing 2–3 against Vienna and 1–7 against Sochaux. People hoped that the conditions would change the fortunes of the club. Basel fans were becoming frustrated because 36 of the first 52 championships had gone to the cities of Zürich, Geneva or Bern. Even small towns had been able to celebrate a championship win. The championship had never been won by a team from Basel. Fourteen teams played in the 1951–52 Nationalliga A. Basel started their 1951–52 season well, winning the first six games in a row, but lost four of the next five games and slipped in the league table. They then won six games and were again in contention for the league championship. Near the end of the season, they lost five games in a row. Basel finished in fourth. Basel started in the 3rd principal round of the Swiss Cup on 4 November 1951 with a home game against lower tier Wettingen and won 7–0. Basel won 3–2 against Nationalliga A team Locarno and beat Nationalliga A team Chiasso 3–1. In the quarter-finals Basel beat Servette and faced Grasshopper Club in the semi-final but lost.

At the beginning of the 1952–53 Nationalliga A season, René Bader became club trainer. Bader acted as player-manager and Willy Dürr was his assistant; Dürr stood at the sideline when Bader played. Basel won their first league title in the championship of the 1952–53 season, four points ahead of second place. Josef Hügi was the top league goal scorer, sharing the title with Eugen Meier from Young Boys, having scored 32 points each. In the Swiss Cup, Basel started in the 3rd principal round with a 10–0 win against Helvetia Bern and in the round of four they beat Thun 5–0. In the next round they won 4–1 against Grenchen. All three games were home ties. In the quarter-finals Basel were drawn away against Servette Genève, went into overtime, and lost 3–4.

Basel ended the 1953–54 Nationalliga A season in 8th with 24 points, losing to La Chaux-de-Fonds by 18 points. Josef Hügi was Basel's top league goal scorer during the 1953–54 season with 30 goals. Basel joined the Swiss Cup in the 3rd principal round with a home match in the Landhof against Grenchen. The only goal of the match fell a couple of minutes before the final whistle and Basel were knocked out of the competition. In the next season, René Bader stayed as the team's player-coach but only played in one test match. Basel ended the championship for the 1954–55 season in ninth with 24 points. Basel joined the Swiss Cup, playing against lower tier local team FC Riehen at the Landhof, and won 6–0. In the fourth round they were drawn at home to lower tier FC Olten and won 2–0. In the fifth round Basel lost to Zürich.

During the previous years, more players were joining and leaving the club. The other Swiss clubs' policies of buying new players was increasing quickly and transfer fees rose rapidly. Basel, under the leadership of Jules Düblin, tried to stay clear of this transfer trading. Since they had lost important players, though, the Basel board of directors changed their approach. Béla Sárosi was hired as new team manager and the team made various transfers. Fourteen teams contested in the 1955–56 Nationalliga A: the top 12 teams from the previous season and the newly promoted teams Urania Genève Sport and FC Schaffhausen. Basel ended the championship of the 1955–56 season in seventh. Basel joined the Swiss Cup in the third principal round. They were drawn away against lower tier local team SC Binningen, but because they waived the home advantage the match was played at the Landhof and Basel won 5–0. Rolf Keller scored a hat-trick. In the fourth round they were drawn at home to lower tier FC Emmenbrücke and Basel won 6–2. Josef Hügi scored a hat-trick. In the fifth round Basel were drawn at home to Biel-Bienne and won 7–3. Gottlieb Stäuble scored a hat-trick. In the quarter-finals Basel were drawn away against Cantonal Neuchatel and lost.

Basel ended the championship of the 1956–57 season in 4th. Basel joined the Swiss Cup in the third principal round. They were drawn away and won 1–0. In the fourth round they were drawn away to lower tier Luzern, ending in a goalless draw after overtime. The replay was held at the Landhof and Basel lost. Rudi Strittich was hired as team manager for the next season. Basel ended the championship of the season in ninth with 24 points, 19 points behind Young Boys. Basel joined the Swiss Cup in the third principal round. They were drawn at home at the Landhof against lower tier local team FC Olten on 2 November 1957. Hans Weber scored five goals during the second half of the game and Basel won 8–0. In the fourth round, Basel were drawn at home against lower tier FC Bern but lost.

During the 1958–59 season, Jules Düblin was the club's chairman for his 13th successive, and final, season. Düblin presided the club from July 1946 until May 1959 and is the most permanent president that the club has had to date. Bruno Michaud returned from Lausanne-Sport, and Fredy Kehrli, Jean-Jacques Maurer and Charles Turin were hired from Biel-Bienne, who had suffered relegation the previous season. Roberto Frigerio was hired from Schaffhausen and Antoine Kohn from Karlsruher SC. Basel were beaten 0–2 by FC Moutier, a team from the 1. Liga. This was one bad result too many, so Jules Düblin replaced Strittich with their ex-trainer René Bader. Basel lost 1–2 against La Chaux-de-Fonds and lost at home 1–4 against Grenchen. They then won 5–0 away against Lausanne-Sport and 6–1 at home against Bellinzona. Under the new manager, things did not change immediately, as Basel slipped to second to last in the table after round 15. But in the last 11 rounds the team lost only one match and rose to sixth. Basel entered the Swiss Cup in the third principal round. They were drawn at home at the Landhof against third tier local team Old Boys on 26 October and won 3–0. Basel lost to FC Moutier in the next round.

== Ernst Weber, chairman (1959–1962) ==
Ernst Weber replaced Jules Düblin as the club's chairman after the AGM on 27 May 1959. Jenő Vincze replaced René Bader as new team manager. Hans Hügi moved on to Young Fellows Zürich after 11 seasons and 220 league and cup games for Basel. Hermann Suter, who had played 16 seasons in 229 league and cup games, and had scored 104 goals, ended his active football career. Antoine Kohn moved on to play for Fortuna '54. Basel started the season badly, winning only one of their first 16 games and staying in the lower regions of the league table. However, with five victories in their last ten league matches, the team brought themselves to tenth. Basel entered the Swiss Cup in the third principal round. They were drawn away against third tier SC Derendingen and won 1–0. In the next round, Basel were drawn at home at the Landhof against lower-tier team FC Porrentruy and won 5–2. In round 16, Basel played a home 1–1 draw with the Young Boys but lost the replay 3–5.

Basel lost two games at the Landhof against VfR Mannheim and in the St. Jakob Stadium against Santos. The match against Santos was one of the highlights of the test games despite the 2–8 defeat. Gottlieb Stäuble and Josef Hügi scored for Basel. Coutinho scored five and Pelé scored three for Santos. 14,000 spectators paid for tickets to see the game, much needed money for the club. Despite a home defeat against Young Fellows in the first match, Basel started the 1960–61 season well, winning six of their first eight matches. They then had six consecutive defeats and failed to score a single goal. Basel slipped from the table top down to the relegation zone before they managed win any games. Basel ended the season in 5th. Basel entered the Swiss Cup in the third principal round. They were drawn away against third tier local club Concordia Basel. Despite an early 1–0 lead and in total 18–0 corners, Werner Decker and Heinz Wirz each scored for the underdogs who had a young Karl Odermatt in their team. Basel lost 2–1. Odermatt's football skills were noted, and he and Decker later transferred to Basel.

Jiří Sobotka was appointed as Basel's new team manager in their 1961–62 season. Basel played six games in the newly formed International Football Cup. Their friendly match against 1. FC Köln at the end of the season was one of the highlights of the test games and ended in a 4–4 draw. This was the farewell game for Josef Hügi who was moving on to play for Zürich the following season. 14,000 spectators paid their entrance tickets to see the game, much needed money for the club. A contract was made between Weber and the scorer of the final goal of the match, Benthaus. Basel were appointed as one of four Swiss representatives in the newly founded International Football Cup. The 1961–62 International Football Cup took place during the summer break. Basel played in Group B4 with Sparta Rotterdam, IF Elfsborg and SC Tasmania 1900 Berlin but finished the group in last. Basel finished the season in seventh. Basel entered the Swiss Cup in the third principal round. They were drawn at home against third-tier club SR Delémont. Despite being 0–2 early in the game, they came back to win 3–2. In the fourth round they faced fourth tier local club FC Breite with Hans Hügi (retired from active football) in another home game. Older brother Hans Hügi defended against younger brother Josef Hügi but Josef Hügi and Basel won 3–0. In the fifth round Basel won due to an own goal by Zürich, but were defeated in the quarter-final by Bellinzona.

== Third cup win ==
Lucien Schmidlin was voted as new club chairman at the AGM to follow Ernst Weber. 19-year-old Karl Odermatt was transferred from Concordia Basel. He joined in a swap; Hansueli Oberer and Silvan Thüler went to Concordia. "Seppe" Hugi, who had played 363 competition games for the club and in these had scored 272 goals, went to play for Zürich. Basel were appointed as one of four Swiss representatives in the International Football Cup (IFC) during their 1962–63 season. The 1962–63 IFC took place during the summer break. Basel played in Group B3 with PSV Eindhoven, HNK Rijeka and Rot-Weiss Oberhausen. Basel ended the group stage in third. The winners of the group were HNK Rijeka. Basel finished the championship in sixth. In the Swiss Cup, Basel started in the 3rd principal round with a 4–0 home win in the St. Jakob Stadium against Black Stars. In the 4th round, they played away against Young Boys and won 2–0. In the next round, they won 7–1 at home against SC Burgdorf. In the quarter-finals, Basel were drawn away against Chiasso and won 2–1. The semi-final was played in the St. Jakob Stadium and Basel beat Lausanne-Sport 1–0. The Wankdorf Stadium hosted the Swiss Cup Final on 15 April and Basel played against favorites Grasshopper Club Zürich. Two goals after half time, one by Heinz Blumer and the second from Otto Ludwig, gave Basel a 2–0 victory and their third Cup win. Peter Füri played in every game except for the final due to an illness.

During the winter break of the 1963–64 season the team went on a world tour. They visited British Hong Kong, Malaysia, Singapore, Australia, New Zealand, French Polynesia, Mexico and the United States. Jiří Sobotka, with 16 players, 15 members of staff, supporters and journalists participated in the world tour from 10 January to 10 February 1964. Team captain Bruno Michaud filmed the events with his super-8 camera. Basel started the season well, winning four of the first five matches. Despite three away defeats, the team were championship leaders with seven wins and three draws. The second half of the season, after the world tour, started with three losses. Basel slipped down in the league table and finished the championship in seventh. As title holders in the Swiss Cup, Basel started in the 3rd principal round with an easy away win against SC Schöftland. In the round of 32 they played against Concordia and won with ease. In the round of 16, Basel were drawn against lower classed Porrentruy. The player-manager of Porrentruy at the time was Basel's former striker Josef Hügi and the game ended with a surprising 0–1 defeat. As Swiss Cup holders, Basel were qualified for the 1963–64 European Cup Winners' Cup competition. Here they were drawn against the Scottish cup holders Celtic. Basel lost 1–5 and 0–5. Basel played against Grasshoppers Zürich in the quarter-finals of the Swiss Cup. Basel won the match 3–1 in overtime. Hans Weber scored the equaliser two minutes before the end of the regular time. This was the last match for the popular Basel captain; he died of cancer seven weeks later. Between his first appearance in 1949 and his death in February 1965 he made 380 appearances for Basel, scoring 68 goals.

Basel finished the 1964–65 season in eighth with 27 points in the 1964–65 Nationalliga A. It was a mediocre season for Basel. In the Swiss Cup, Basel started in the round of 64 on 10 October 1964 with a home win against lower classed Locarno. In the next round they played at home against Bern and won 3–1. They won at home 3–2 against Lausanne-Sport in the round of 16. After the quarter-final against Grasshoppers Zürich, Basel were drawn at home again for the semi-final against Sion on 7 March 1965. Basel were defeated 2–3 and Sion continued to the final, in which they defeated Servette. Basel were qualified for the 1964–65 Inter-Cities Fairs Cup and in the first round they played CA Spora Luxembourg. A 2–0 home win and a 0–1 away defeat was enough to take them through to the second round. Two defeats against Strasbourg ended their Fairs Cup competition.

== See also ==
- FC Basel
- List of FC Basel players
- List of FC Basel seasons
- Football in Switzerland

== Sources ==
- Die ersten 125 Jahre / 2018. Publisher: Josef Zindel im Friedrich Reinhardt Verlag, Basel. ISBN 978-3-7245-2305-5
- FC Basel Archiv / Verein "Basler Fussballarchiv"
