= 1952–53 Swiss Cup =

Tournament details
- Country: Switzerland

Final positions
- Champions: Young Boys
- Runners-up: Grasshopper Club

The 1952–53 Swiss Cup was the 28th season of Switzerland's football cup competition, organised annually since 1925–26 by the Swiss Football Association.

== Overview ==
This season's cup competition began with the first game of the first round, played on Saturday 7 September 1952. The other games were played on the week-end of 14 September. The competition was to be completed on Ascension Thursday, 14 May 1953, with the final, which, since 1937, was traditionally held at the former Wankdorf Stadium in Bern. The clubs from the 1952–53 Swiss 1. Liga were given a bye for the first round, they joined the competition in the second round on the week-end of 5 October. The clubs from this season's Nationalliga A (NLA) and from this season's Nationalliga B (NLB) were given byes for the first two rounds. These teams joined the competition in the third round, which was played on the week-end of 26 October.

The matches were played in a knockout format. In the event of a draw after 90 minutes, the match went into extra time. In the event of a draw at the end of extra time, a replay was foreseen and this was played on the visiting team's pitch. If the replay ended in a draw after extra time, a toss of a coin would establish the team that qualified for the next round.

== Round 1 ==
In the first round, the lower league teams that had qualified themselves for the competition through their regional football association's regional cup competitions or their association's requirements, competed here. Whenever possible, the draw respected local regionalities. The first round was played on Saturday 14 September 1952, with two exceptions.

=== Summary ===
Team 1	Score	Team 2
7 September 1952
FC Bassecourt	3–1	FC Courtételle
14 September 1952
FC Reconvilier	3–1 (a.e.t.)	FC Tramelan
FC Grünstern (Ipsach)	3–5 (a.e.t.)	FC Nidau
FC Klus-Balsthal	3–5	SC Bümpliz
Köniz	5–1	FC Zuchwil
FC Konolfingen	1–3	FC Längasse (Bern)
FC Langenthal	4–1	FC Trimbach
FC Gerlafingen	1–1 (a.e.t.)	FC Luterbach
FC Breite (Basel)	1–5	Black Stars
FC Pratteln	4–5	FC Reinach (BL)
Dornach	2–0	FC Riehen
FC Muhen	2–2 (a.e.t.)	FC Turgi
Zofingen	4–0	FC Schönenwerd
FC Adliswil	2–1	FC Wetzikon
FC Polizei Zürich	1–2 (a.e.t.)	FC Horgen
Uster	2–0	FC Affoltern-Zürich
SV Seebach	4–2 (a.e.t.)	FC Unterstrass (ZH)
FC Feuerthalen	4–2	FC Neuhausen
Gossau	3–1	FC Fortuna (SG)
FC Uzwil	3–1	Kreuzlingen
FC St.Margarethen	2–2 (a.e.t.)	FC Rorschach
FC Glarus	3–4	Chur
FC Altdorf (Uri)	8–2	Emmenbrücke
Losone Sportiva	0–12	Bodio
Stade Lausanne	3–3 (a.e.t.)	Bulle
FC Vignoble Cully	1–2 (a.e.t.)	Monthey
FC Veyrier	1–6	FC Rhexia Genève
Amicale Abattoirs Geneve	3–1	US Campagnes (GE)
FC Perroy	1–10	CA Genève
FC Saint-Prex	0–4	FC Chêne-Aubonne
FC Bussigny	1–3	FC Stade Payerne
FC Renens	9–0	FC Vallorbe
FC Brig	0–2	FC Saint-Léonard
Le Locle-Sports	7–4	Blue Stars Les Verrières
28 September 1952
FC Oberdorf	4–3 (a.e.t.)	FC Röschenz

Replays

Team 1	Score	Team 2
28 September 1952
FC Luterbach	0–1	FC Gerlafingen
FC Turgi	2–1	FC Muhen
FC Rorschach	2–1	FC St.Margarethen
Bulle	4–0	Stade Lausanne

== Round 2 ==
The clubs from the 1952–53 Swiss 1. Liga had been given a bye for the first round, they now joined the competition here, in the second round.

=== Summary ===
Team 1	Score	Team 2
5 October 1952
FC Längasse (Bern)	1–6	Lengnau
Thun	8–1	FC Nidau
FC Gerlafingen	1–3	FC Helvetia Bern
FC Turgi	2–1	SC Derendingen
Zofingen	0–1	Burgdorf
Black Stars	2–6	Nordstern
SC Kleinhüningen	3–2	Dornach
Old Boys	8–2	FC Reinach (BL)
FC Oberdorf	1–6	Concordia
FC Horgen	2–3	Baden
Schöftland	3–8	FC Oerlikon (ZH)
FC Olten	2–2 (a.e.t.)	FC Adliswil
SV seebach	0–7	Blue Stars
SV Ceresio	2–3	FC Feuerthalen
Uster	3–1	FC Küsnacht (ZH)
Gossau	0–1	Arbon
Red Star	6–0	FC Uzwil
Chur	1–3	FC Wetzikon
Brühl	1–0	FC Rorschach
Mendrisio	3–1	Bodio
FC Altdorf (Uri)	3–1	US Pro Daro
US Bienne-Boujean	6–3	FC Langenthal
FC Bassecourt	1–5	Saint-Imier-Sports
Moutier	2–3	Le Locle-Sports
FC Porrentruy	3–2	FC Reconvilier
SC Bümpliz	2–3	Yverdon-Sport
Vevey Sports	4–1 (a.e.t.)	Köniz
CS International Genève	8–1	FC Chêne-Aubonne
FC Renens	2–3 (a.e.t.)	CS La Tour-de-Peilz
Martigny-Sports	2–0	Amicale Abattoirs Geneve
Bulle	2–0	Central Fribourg
FC Stade Payerne	0–1	Union Sportive Lausanne
Monthey	3–1	Sion
FC Sierre	3–0	FC Saint-Léonard
Montreux-Sports	1–2 (a.e.t.)	CA Genève
FC Forward Morges	3–0	FC Rhexia Genève

Replay

Team 1	Score	Team 2
12 October 1952
FC Olten	1–0	FC Adliswil

== Round 3 ==
The teams from the NLA and NLB entered the cup competition in this round. However, the teams from the NLA were seeded and could not be drawn against each other. Whenever possible, the draw respected local regionalities. The third round was played on the week-end of 26 October. Due to the number of teams, one team was awarded a bye, this was awarded to Thun.

=== Summary ===
Team 1	Score	Team 2
26 October 1952
Chiasso	7–1	FC Oerlikon (ZH)
Bellinzona	2–1	Blue Stars
Lausanne-Sport	10–1	Vevey Sports
Burgdorf	1–5	La Chaux-de-Fonds
Schaffhausen	3–2 (a.e.t.)	Brühl
Locarno	9–3	FC Altdorf (Uri)
SC Zug	5–1	Mendrisio
Zürich	7–2	Baden
Fribourg	6–1	CS International Genève
CS La Tour-de-Peilz	2–6	Urania Genève Sport
Young Boys	6–2	FC Olten
Aarau	2–5	Concordia
Basel	10–0	FC Helvetia Bern
FC Wil	3–2	Arbon
Luzern	3–1	Nordstern
Winterthur	5–1	FC Wetzikon
Lugano	3–3 (a.e.t.)	Red Star
St. Gallen	6–0	FC Feuerthalen
Solothurn	3–1	Le Locle-Sports
US Bienne-Boujean	0–3	Bern
Martigny-Sports	1–2	Servette
Bulle	1–2	Union Sportive Lausanne
ES Malley	7–1	Monthey
FC Porrentruy	0–5	Biel-Bienne
Saint-Imier-Sports	0–3	Grenchen
FC Turgi	2–1	Old Boys
FC Sierre	2–4	Cantonal Neuchâtel
CA Genève	2–4	FC Forward Morges
Yverdon-Sport	0–3	Lengnau
9 November 1952
Young Fellows	3–0	Uster
23 November 1952
SC Kleinhüningen	1–13	Grasshopper Club

Replay

Team 1	Score	Team 2
9 November 1952
Lugano	1–0	Red Star

=== Matches ===
26 October 1952

Zürich	7–2	Baden
Lehrieder 8' (1:0); Schneiter 16' (pen.); Lehrieder 27' (3:0); Bosshard 28' (4:0); Rossi 31' (5:0); Lehrieder 73' (6:1); Koch 77' (7:1)	FCZ summary	56' (pen.) Guido Rossmann; 80' (7:2) Schmid

Letzigrund, Zürich
Attendance: 1,800
Referee: (Switzerland) Josef Gulde (St. Gallen)
- Baden played in the 1. Liga in 1952/1953.

26 October 1952

Young Boys	6–2	FC Olten
Goal	YB summary	Goal

Wankdorf Stadium, Bern
- Olten played in the 1. Liga in 1952/1953.

26 October 1952

Aarau	2–5	Concordia
Goal	FCA summary	Goal

Stadion Brügglifeld, Aarau
- Concordia played in the 1. Liga in 1952/1953.

26 October 1952
14:30

Basel	10 – 0	Helvetia Bern
Bielser 3' (1:0); Hügi (II) 6' (2:0); Hügi (II) 8' (3:0); Bielser 13' (4:0); Bader 23' (pen. 5:0); Bannwart 35' (6:0); Hügi (II) 63' (pen. 7:0); Hügi (I) 77' (8:0); Hügi (II) 82' (9:0); Thalmann 85' (10:0)	FCB summary

Landhof, Basel
Attendance: 2,800
Referee: (Switzerland) Locher (Zürich)
- Helvetia Bern played in the 1. Liga in 1952/1953

26 October 1952

Martigny-Sports	1–2	Servette
Goal	Servette summary	Pasteur; Fatton

Stade d'Octodure, Martigny

== Round 4 ==
=== Summary ===
Team 1	Score	Team 2
22 November 1952
Basel	5–0	Thun
22 or 23 November 1952
Chiasso	0–1	Bellinzona
Lausanne-Sport	2–0	La Chaux-de-Fonds
Lugano	1–2	St. Gallen
Schaffhausen	4–3	Locarno
SC Zug	1–2	Zürich
Solothurn	0–0 (a.e.t.)	Bern
Fribourg	1–1	Urania Genève Sport
Young Boys	5–0	Concordia
Servette	9–0	Union Sportive Lausanne
FC Wil	0–2	Luzern
Young Fellows	3–3 (a.e.t.)	Winterthur
ES Malley	2–3	Biel-Bienne
Grenchen	12–0	FC Turgi
FC Forward Morges	2–4 *	Cantonal Neuchâtel
4 January 1953
Grasshopper Club	2–1	Lengnau

- The match Morges–Cantonal was played in Neuchâtel.

Replay

Team 1	Score	Team 2
7 December 1952
Bern	3–1	Solothurn
Urania Genève Sport	1–2	Fribourg
Winterthur	2–1	Young Fellows

=== Matches ===
22 November 1952
14:30

Basel	5–0	Thun
Thalmann 35' (1:0); Bader 62' (2:0); Bader 65' (3:0); Bader 87' (4:0); Bannwart 89' (5:0)	FCB summary

Landhof, Basel
Attendance: 2,200
Referee: (Switzerland) Constant Ducret (Vevey)
- Thun played in the 1. Liga in 1952/53.

23 November 1952

SC Zug	1–2	Zürich
Walter Nussbaumer 85' (1:1)	FCZ summary	20' (0:1) Lehrieder; 89' (1:2) Schneiter

Allmend Stadion, Zug
Attendance: 2,500
Referee: (Switzerland) Josef Gulde (St. Gallen)
- SC Zug played in the NLB in 1952/53.

23 November 1952

Young Boys	5–0	Concordia
Goal	YB summary

Wankdorf Stadium, Bern

23 November 1952

Servette	9–0	Union Sportive Lausanne
1x Ballaman; 2x Zahnd; 1x Fatton; 3x Pasteur; 2x Tamini	Servette summary

Stade des Charmilles, Geneva
- US Lausanne played in the 1. Liga in 1952/53.

== Round 5 ==
=== Summary ===
Team 1	Score	Team 2
4 January 1953
Lausanne-Sport	5–1	Winterthur
St. Gallen	2–1	Cantonal Neuchâtel
Schaffhausen	4–0	Luzern
Fribourg	0–1	Zürich
Young Boys	4–0	Bellinzona
Basel	4–1	Grenchen
11 January 1953
Bern	1–3	Servette
Biel-Bienne	1–6	Grasshopper Club

=== Matches ===
4 January 1953

Fribourg	0–1	Zürich
	FCZ summary	88' (0:1) Lehrieder

Stade Universitaire Saint-Léonard, Fribourg
Attendance: 2,000
Referee: (Switzerland) Edmund Bertsche (Neuhausen am Rheinfall)

4 January 1953

Young Boys	4–0	Bellinzona
Goal	YB summary

Wankdorf Stadium, Bern

4 January 1953
14:30

Basel	4–1	Grenchen
Bannwart 60' (1:0); Bannwart 66' (2:0); Morf 68' (o.g. 3:0); Thalmann (4:1)	Summary	82' (3:1) Sidler

Landhof, Basel
Attendance: 6,500
Referee: (Switzerland) Roger Rapin (Lausanne)

11 January 1953

Bern	1–3	Servette
Goal	Servette summary	Mauron; Tamini; Fatton

Stadion Neufeld, Bern

== Quarter-finals ==
=== Summary ===
Team 1	Score	Team 2
15 February 1953
Young Boys	1–1 (a.e.t.)	Schaffhausen
Lausanne-Sport	1–1 (a.e.t.)	Zürich
Servette	4–3	Basel
St. Gallen	0–5 (a.e.t.)	Grasshopper Club

Replays

Team 1	Score	Team 2
22 February 1953
Zürich	1–0 *	Lausanne-Sport
1 March 1953
Schaffhausen	0–2	Young Boys

- The replay Zürich–Lausanne-Sport was played in Lausanne.

=== Matches ===
15 February 1953

Young Boys	1–1 (a.e.t.)	Schaffhausen
Goal	YB summary	Goal

Wankdorf Stadium, Bern

1 March 1953
Replay

Schaffhausen	0–2	Young Boys
	YB summary	Goal

Stadion Breite, Schaffhausen

15 February 1953

Lausanne-Sport	1–1 (a.e.t.)	Zürich
Glisovic 10' (1:0)	FCZ summary	21' (1:1) Frischherz

Pontaise, Lausanne
Attendance: 3,500
Referee: (Switzerland) Albert von Gunten (Bern)

22 February 1953
Replay

Zürich	1–0	Lausanne-Sport
Lehrieder 24' (1:0)	FCZ summary

Pontaise, Lausanne
Attendance: 7,000
Referee: (Switzerland) Fritz Zutter (Bern)

15 February 1953
14:45

Servette	4–3 (a.e.t.)	Basel
Fatton 5' (1:0); Ballaman 10' (2:0); Mezzena 90+9' (3:3); Fatton 91' (4:3)	FCB summary	22' (2:1) Hügi (II); 23' (2:2) Bader; 50' (2:3) Hügi (II)

Charmilles Stadium, Geneva
Attendance: 13,000
Referee: (Switzerland) René Baumberger (Lausanne)

== Semi-finals ==
=== Summary ===
Team 1	Score	Team 2
8 March 1953
Zürich	0–0 (a.e.t.)	Young Boys
Young Boys	3–0	Zürich
Servette	0–1	Grasshopper Club

Replay

Team 1	Score	Team 2
30 March 1953
Young Boys	3–0	Zürich

=== Matches ===
8 March 1953

Zürich	0–0 (a.e.t.)	Young Boys
	FCZ summary

Letzigrund, Zürich
Attendance: 7,500
Referee: (Switzerland) Willy Rufli (Bremgarten)

30 March 1953
Replay

Young Boys	3–0	Zürich
Meier 45' (1:0); Meier 60' (2:0); Meier 65' (3:0)	FCZ summary

Wankdorf Stadium, Bern
Attendance: 14,000
Referee: (Switzerland) August Andres (Birsfelden)

8 March 1953

Servette	0–1	Grasshopper Club
	Summary	14' (0:1) Hüssy

Stade des Charmilles, Geneva

== Final ==
The final was held in the former Wankdorf Stadium in Bern on Ascension Thursday 1953.

=== Summary ===
Team 1	Score	Team 2
14 May 1953
Young Boys	3–1	Grasshopper Club

=== Telegram ===
14 May 1953
15:00

Young Boys	3–1	Grasshopper Club
Grütter 5' (1:0); Bähler 54' (2:1); Sing 81' (3:1)	Fussball-Schweiz summary	43' (1:1) Vonlanthen

Wankdorf Stadium, Bern
Attendance: 26,000
Referee: (Switzerland) Maurice Tasca (Geneva)

Young Boys won the Swiss Cup and this was the club's third cup title to this date.

== Further in Swiss football ==
- 1952–53 Nationalliga A
- 1952–53 Nationalliga B
- 1952–53 Swiss 1. Liga

== Sources ==
- Fussball-Schweiz
- FCB Cup games 1952–53 at fcb-achiv.ch
- Switzerland 1952–53 at RSSSF

Preceded by 1951–52	Swiss Cup seasons	Succeeded by 1953–54
