= 1952–53 FC Basel season =

FC Basel
1952–53 season
- Chairman: Jules Düblin
- Manager: René Bader with Willy Dürr
- Ground: Landhof, Basel
- Nationalliga A: Champions
- Swiss Cup: Quarter-finals
- Top goalscorer: League: Josef Hügi (32); All: Josef Hügi (38)
- Highest home attendance: 13,000 on 7 June 1953 vs Servette
- Lowest home attendance: 8,000 on 21 December 1952 vs Fribourg
- Average home league attendance: 7,869

The 1952–53 season was Fussball Club Basel 1893's 59th season in their existence. It was their seventh consecutive season in the top flight of Swiss football after their promotion from the Nationalliga B the season 1945–46. They played their home games in the Landhof, in the Wettstein Quarter in Kleinbasel. Jules Düblin was the club's chairman for the seventh successive season.

== Overview ==
At the beginning of the season René Bader took over the job as club trainer from Ernst Hufschmid who had acted as trainer the previous five years. Bader acted as player-coach and Willy Dürr was his assistant coach, he stood at the side line when Bader played.

Basel played a total of 43 games during this season. Of these 26 games were in the domestic league, four games were in the Swiss Cup and 13 were test games. The test games resulted with seven victories, three were drawn and three ended with defeats. In total, including the test games and the cup competition, they won 27 games, drew 11 and lost five times. In the 43 games they scored 146 goals and conceded 72 goals.

There were fourteen teams contesting in the 1952–53 Nationalliga A and the bottom two teams in the league table were to be relegated. Basel won 17 of the 26 games, losing only once, and they scored 72 goals conceding 38. Basel won the championship four points clear of Young Boys in second position and ten points ahead of Grasshopper Club Zürich who were third. Josef Hügi was the team's top league goal scorer. He shared the title of the league top scorer with Eugen Meier (Young Boys) both having netted 32 times during the season. Three players were teams joint second best league scorers René Bader, Walter Bannwart and Bielser each scored nine times.

In the Swiss Cup Basel started in the 3rd principal round with a 10–0 win against Helvetia Bern and in the 4th round they beat Thun 5–0. In the next round they won 4–1 against Grenchen. All three games were home ties. In the quarter-finals Basel were drawn away against Servette Genève and the tie went into extra time, Basel then losing 3–4.

== Players ==
Note: Flags indicate national team as defined under FIFA eligibility rules; some limited exceptions apply. Players may hold more than one non-FIFA nationality.

No.	Pos.	Nation	Player
—	GK	SUI	Walter Müller (games/goals: 8/0)
—	GK	SUI	Werner Schley (games/goals: 19/0)
—	GK	SUI	Werner Wenger
—	DF	SUI	Werner Bopp (games/goals: 26/0)
—	DF	SUI	Hans-Rudolf Fitze (games/goals: 2/0)
—	DF	SUI	Hans Hügi (I) (games/goals: 26/4)
—	DF	HUN	György Mogoy (games/goals: 25/4)
—	DF	SUI	Hans Weber (games/goals: 10/0)
—	MF	SUI	Eugen Büchel

No.	Pos.	Nation	Player
—	MF	FRA	Pierre Redolfi (games/goals: 26/0)
—	MF	SUI	Kurt Maurer (games/goals: 26/1)
—	MF	SUI	Kurt Thalmann (games/goals: 26/3)
—	FW	SUI	René Bader (games/goals: 20/9)
—	FW	SUI	Walter Bannwart (games/goals: 26/9)
—	FW	SUI	Walter Bielser (games/goals: 21/9)
—	FW	SUI	Marcel Frei
—	FW	SUI	Josef Hügi (games/goals: 26/32)
—	FW	SUI	Marcel Leisinger

== Results ==
Legend

Win Draw Loss Postponed

=== Friendly matches ===
==== Pre-season and mid-season ====
28 June 1952 Pre-season	Basel (Switzerland)	2–6	(Germany) VfB Stuttgart	Landhof, Basel
18:30	Bader 37' (1:0); Weber 75' (2:3)	Summary	(1:1) Blessing (1:2) Blessing; 57' (1:3) Blessing (2:4) Blessing; 79' (2:5) Baitinger; 90' (2:6) Läpple	Attendance: 5,500; Referee: (Switzerland) Dörflinger Grenchen

2 August 1952 Pre-season	SC Kleinhüningen (Switzerland)	2–8	(Switzerland) Basel	Schorenmatte, Basel
17:30	2' (1:0)	Summary	(pen. 1:1) Hügi (II) (1:2) Bader (1:4) Hügi (II); 65' (pen. 1:5) Bader (1:6) Hügi (II); Bader; Bader	Attendance: 800; Referee: (Switzerland) Kellerhals Basel

14 August 1952 Pre-season	Old Boys (Switzerland)	1–7	(Switzerland) Basel	Basel
	Goal	Summary	(3x) Hügi (II) (2x) Bader (1x) Bielser (1x) Thalmann

17 August 1952 Pre-season	Freiburger FC (Germany)	1–0	(Switzerland) Basel	Möslestadion, Freiburg
	Faber	Summary		Attendance: 4,000; Referee: (Germany) Merkel

24 August 1952 Pre-season	Basel (Switzerland)	11 – 1	(Switzerland) Old Boys	Landhof, Basel
	Hügi (II) 13' (1:0); Hügi (II) 14' (2:0); Bader 29' (3:0); Bielser (4:0); Bannwart 51' (5:0); Hügi (II) 54' (6:0); Hügi (II) 60' (7:0); Grauer (o.g. 8:1); Bader (9:1); Bielser (10:1); Hügi (II) (11:1)	Summary	(pen. 1:7) Eggler	Attendance: 1,000; Referee: (Switzerland) Kellerhals Basel

11 November 1952 Mid-season	Franche-Comté XI (France)	2–5	(Switzerland) Basel	Besançon
	Gardien (1:0); Biancheri 10' (2:0)	Summary	21' (2:1) Hügi (II); 40' (2:2) Hügi (II); 53' (2:3) Thalmann; 85' (2:4) Hügi (II); 88' (2:5) Hügi (II)	Attendance: 4,000

==== Winter break to end of season ====
8 February 1953 Winter break	Basel (Switzerland)	3–3	(Germany) Kickers Offenbach	Landhof, Basel
15:00	Thalmann 31' (1:1); Hügi (II) 33' (2:1); Hügi (II) 49' (3:1)	Summary	19' (0:1) Kircher; 63' (3:2) Finke; 66' (3:3) Kraus	Attendance: 3,400; Referee: (Switzerland) Andres

8 March 1953 Mid-season	Luzern (Switzerland)	1–5	(Switzerland) Basel	Stadion Allmend, Luzern
	Kruppa 42' (pen. 1:2)	Summary	4' (0:1) Hügi (II) (0:2) Hügi (II); 52' (1:3) Hügi (II); 85' (1:4) Hügi (II); 87' (1:5) Thalmann	Attendance: 3,200; Referee: (Switzerland) F. Buchmüller Zürich

21 March 1953 Mid-season	Basel (Switzerland)	2–5	(Germany) 1. FC Nürnberg	Landhof, Basel
16:15	Hüssy (II) 12' (1:0); Büchel 85' (2:4)	Summary	17' (1:1) Schweinberger; 26' (1:2) Glomb; 39' (1:3) Schweinberger; 80' (1:4) Winterstein; 89' (2:5) Schweinberger	Attendance: 2,500; Referee: (Switzerland) Andres

20 May 1953 Mid-season	Basel (Switzerland)	1–2	(Denmark) Skovshoved IF	Landhof, Basel
18:15	Hügi (II) 44' (1:1); Hügi (II) 75' (2:1)	Summary	30' (0:1) Sörensen (II)	Attendance: 2,500; Referee: (Switzerland) Hauser Basel

26 May 1953 Mid-season	Basel (Switzerland)	2–2	(Germany) SV Werder Bremen	Landhof, Basel
18:15	Mariani 7' (1:0); Rindlisbacher 15' (2:1)	Summary	12' (1:1) Gaerner; 66' (2:2) Gernhardt	Attendance: 2,500; Referee: (Switzerland) von Wartburg Bern

11 June 1953 Mid-season	Basel (Switzerland)	4–3	(Brazil) Clube Atlético Juventus	Landhof, Basel
18:30	Bielser 68' (1:3); Bielser 78' (2:3); Hügi (II) 78' (3:3); Bannwart 88' (4:3)	Summary	32' (0:1) Durval; 50' (0:2) Durval; 52' (0:3) Bazao	Attendance: 6,000; Referee: (Switzerland) Dörflinger Grenchen

19 June 1953 End of season	Basel (Switzerland)	1–1	(Brazil) Clube Atlético Juventus	Landhof, Basel
18:45	Hügi (II) 2' (1:0)	Summary	48' (1:1) Arias	Attendance: 9,000; Referee: (Switzerland) von Wartburg Bern

=== Nationalliga A ===
==== League matches ====
31 August 1952 Round 1	Young Boys	2–2	Basel	Neufeld, Bern
15:00	Casali (I) 28' (1:0); Casali (I) 55' (2:1)	Summary	53' (1:1) Hügi (II); 82' (2:2) Bielser	Attendance: 6,500; Referee: (Switzerland) Grassi

7 September 1952 Round 2	FC Bern	1–2	Basel	Neufeld, Bern
15:00	Wirsching 80' (1:2)	Summary	50' (0:1) Hügi (II); 77' (0:2) Hügi (II)	Attendance: 5,000; Referee: (Switzerland) Tschopp

14 September 1952 Round 3	Basel	1–1	Lugano	Landhof, Basel
15:00	Bader 59' (pen. 1:1)	Summary	53' (0:1) Vetter	Attendance: 8,000; Referee: (Switzerland) Schüttel

28 September 1952 Round 4	Locarno	3–5	Basel	Stadio del Lido, Locarno
	Ferraris 7' (1:1); Canetti 17' (2:1); Ferraris 82' (3:5)	Summary	4' (0:1) Bielser; 53' (2:2) Hügi (II); 55' (2:3) Hügi (II); 62' (2:4) Thalmann; 69' (pen. 2:5) Bader	Attendance: 1,400; Referee: (Switzerland) Bertsche

8 October 1952 Round 5	Basel	5–1	Zürich	Landhof, Basel
15:00	Molina 8' (o.g.); Hügi (II) 14' (2:0); Bielser 26' (3:0); Bannwart 42' (4:0); Hügi (II) 52' (5:0)	Summary	82' (5:1) Schneiter	Attendance: 8,000; Referee: (Switzerland) Josef Gulde

12 October 1952 Round 6	Lausanne-Sport	1–2	Basel	Olympique de la Pontaise, Lausanne
15:00	Glisevic 11' (1:0)	Summary	14' (1:1) Bielser; 25' (1:2) Bannwart	Attendance: 8,000; Referee: (Switzerland) Grassi

19 October 1952 Round 7	Basel	6–2	Grenchen	Landhof, Basel
15:00	Hügi (II) 15' (1:0); Hügi (II) 22' (2:0); Bielser 25' (3:0); Bader 34' (4:0); Hügi (II) 38' (5:0); Hügi (II) 83' (6:1)	Summary	65' (5:1) Pfister; 83' (6:2) Pfister	Attendance: 5,000; Referee: (Switzerland) W Rufli

2 November 1952 Round 8	La Chaux-de-Fonds	2–6	Basel	Stade Charrière, La Chaux-de-Fonds
14:30	Morand 38' (1:2); Chodat 73' (2:5)	Summary	10' (0:1) Hügi (II); 20' (0:2) Hügi (II); 47' (1:3) Hügi (II); 59' (1:4) Bielser; 67' (1:5) Bannwart; 85' (2:6) Bader	Attendance: 2,700; Referee: (Switzerland) Zutter

9 November 1952 Round 9	Basel	P – P	Chiasso	Landhof, Basel

30 November 1952 Round 10	Bellinzona	2–3	Basel	Stadio Comunale Bellinzona
	Genetelli 7' (1:0); Zanetti 29' (2:1)	Summary	17' (1:1) Hügi (II); 40' (2:2) Hügi (II); 71' (pen. 2:3) Hügi (II)	Attendance: 3,200; Referee: (Switzerland) Berlotti

7 December 1952 Round 11	Basel	1–0	Grasshopper Club	Landhof, Basel
14:30	Bielser 62' (1:0)	Summary		Attendance: 11,000; Referee: (Switzerland) Victor Werrner Schicker, Bern

14 December 1952 Round 12	Servette	3–3	Basel	Charmilles Stadium, Geneva
14:30	Fatton 17' (1:0); Tamini 21' (2:0); Ballaman 68' (3:1)	Summary	33' (2:1) Bader; 77' (3:2) Thalmann; 89' (3:3) Hügi (II)	Attendance: 16,000; Referee: (Switzerland) von Wartburg, Bern

21 December 1952 Round 13	Basel	1–0	Fribourg	Landhof, Basel
14:30	Bannwart 87' (1:0)	Summary		Attendance: 5,000; Referee: (Switzerland) Python, Lausanne

11 January 1953 Round 9	Basel	4–1	Chiasso	Landhof, Basel
14:00	Hügi (II) 3' (1:0); Hügi (I) 21' (2:1); Hügi (II) 69' (3:1); Bader 79' (4:1)	Summary	7' (1:1) Chiesa	Attendance: 6,000; Referee: (Switzerland) Dörflinger, Grenchen

22 February 1953 Round 14	Basel	1–0	Young Boys	Landhof, Basel
14:30	Bielser 85' (1:0) Marc	Summary		Attendance: 8,000; Referee: (Switzerland) W Rufli

1 March 1953 Round 15	Basel	2–2	FC Bern	Landhof, Basel
15:00	Bader 56' (1:0); Hügi (II) 64' (2:0)	Summary	70' (2:1) Schönmann; 78' (2:2) Liechti	Attendance: 6,000; Referee: (Switzerland) Paul Wyssling, Zürich

15 March 1953 Round 16	Lugano	0–0	Basel	Cornaredo, Lugano
		Summary		Attendance: 4,000; Referee: (Switzerland) von Wartburg, Bern

29 March 1953 Round 17	Basel	8–1	Locarno	Landhof, Basel
15:00	Hügi (II) 26' (1:0); Hügi (II) 43' (2:0); Hügi (II) 51' (3:0); Hügi (I) 54' (4:0); Maurer 60' (5:0); Hügi (II) 65' (6:1); Bannwart 82' (7:1); Bannwart 86' (8:1)	Summary	62' (5:1) Canetti	Attendance: 6,800; Referee: (Switzerland) Rapin

12 April 1953 Round 18	Zürich	1–1	Basel	Letzigrund, Zürich
16:00	Lehrieder 43' (1:1)	Summary	32' (0:1) Bannwart	Attendance: 10,000; Referee: (Switzerland) W. Rufli

19 April 1953 Round 19	Basel	1–1	Lausanne-Sport	Landhof, Basel
15:00	Mogoy 8' (pe, 1:1)	Summary	56' (1:1) Glisovic	Attendance: 12,000; Referee: (Switzerland) Zutter Bern

26 April 1953 Round 20	Grenchen	2–3	Basel	Stadion Brühl, Grenchen
	Pfister 10' (1:0); Pfister 46' (2:0)	Summary	50' (2:1) Hügi (I); 60' (2:2) Hügi (II); 65' (2:3) Hügi (II)	Attendance: 5,000; Referee: (Switzerland) Paul Wyssling Zürich

3 May 1953 Round 21	Basel	3–2	La Chaux-de-Fonds	Landhof, Basel
15:00	Hügi (II) 26' (1:0); Bannwart 39' (2:0); Mogoy 84' (pen. 3:2)	Summary	57' (2:1) Chodat; 66' (2:2) Mauron	Attendance: 7,000; Referee: (Switzerland) E. Guidi Bellinzona

10 May 1953 Round 22	Chiasso	4–3	Basel	Stadio Via Comacini Chiasso
	Rossetti 16' (1:0); Riva 31' (2:2); Riva 35' (3:2); Chiesa 48' (4:2)	Summary	17' (1:1) Bielser; 23' (1:2) Hügi (II); 82' (pen. 4:3) Mogoy	Attendance: 2,000; Referee: (Switzerland) Josef Gulde St. Gallen

16 May 1953 Round 23	Basel	2–2	Bellinzona	Landhof, Basel
17:15	Hügi (I) 30' (1:0); Hügi (II) 86' (2:2)	Summary	60' (1:1) Zanetti; 74' (1:2) Sorman	Attendance: 6,500; Referee: (Switzerland) Rapin Lausanne

31 May 1953 Round 24	Grasshopper Club	4–5	Basel	Hardturm, Zürich
16:15	Zappia 2' (1:0); Bickel 22' (2:1); Bickel 56' (3:4); Vonlanthen 85' (4:5)	Summary	8' (1:1) Hügi (II); 28' (2:2) Thalmann; 34' (2:3) Bader; 50' (pen. 2:4) Mogoy; 69' (3:5) Hügi (II)	Attendance: 10,000; Referee: (Switzerland) Dörflinger Grenchen

7 June 1953 Round 25	Basel	1–0	Servette	Landhof, Basel
16:30	Bannwart 34' (1:0)	Summary		Attendance: 12,000; Referee: (Switzerland) Tschopp Delémont

14 June 1953 Round 26	Fribourg	0–1	Basel	St-Leonard, Fribourg
		Summary	46' (0:1) Bader	Attendance: 3,300; Referee: (Switzerland) Merlotti Neuchâtel

==== League table ====
Pos	Team	Pld	W	D	L	GF	GA	GD	Pts	Qualification
1	FC Basel	26	17	8	1	72	38	+34	42	Swiss Champions
2	BSC Young Boys	26	16	6	4	61	39	+22	38	Swiss Cup winners
3	Grasshopper Club Zürich	26	14	4	8	73	39	+34	32	
4	Servette FC Genève	26	12	8	6	61	38	+23	32	
5	FC Chiasso	26	9	8	9	38	52	−14	26	
6	AC Bellinzona	26	9	7	10	45	45	0	25	
7	Lausanne Sports	26	8	8	10	52	45	+7	24	
8	FC La Chaux-de-Fonds	26	8	7	11	53	61	−8	23	
9	FC Fribourg	26	10	3	13	35	53	−18	23	
10	FC Zürich	26	7	8	11	45	48	−3	22	
11	FC Bern	26	6	10	10	40	53	−13	22	
12	FC Grenchen	26	6	8	12	38	54	−16	20	Play-off winners, remain in Nationalliga A
13	FC Lugano	26	5	10	11	38	53	−15	20	Play-off losers, relegated to Nationalliga B
14	FC Locarno	26	5	5	16	33	66	−33	15	Relegated

Source: rsssf.com

=== Swiss Cup ===
26 October 1952 Round 3	Basel	10 – 0	Helvetia Bern	Basel
14:30	Bielser 3' (1:0); Hügi (II) 6' (2:0); Hügi (II) 8' (3:0); Bielser 13' (4:0); Bader 23' (pen. 5:0); Bannwart 35' (6:0); Hügi (II) 63' (pen. 7:0); Hügi (I) 77' (8:0); Hügi (II) 82' (9:0); Thalmann 85' (10:0)	Summary		Stadium: Landhof; Attendance: 2,800; Referee: (Switzerland) Locher Zürich

2 November 1952 Round 4	Basel	5–0	Thun	Basel
14:30	Thalmann 35' (1:0); Bader 62' (2:0); Bader 65' (3:0); Bader 87' (4:0); Bannwart 89' (5:0)	Summary		Stadium: Landhof; Attendance: 2,200; Referee: (Switzerland) Ducret Vevey

4 January 1953 Round 5	Basel	4–1	Grenchen	Landhof, Basel
14:30	Bannwart 60' (1:0); Bannwart 66' (2:0); Morf 68' (o.g. 3:0); Thalmann (4:1)	Summary	82' (3:1) Sidler	Attendance: 6,500; Referee: (Switzerland) Rapin Lausanne

15 February 1953 Quarter-final	Servette	4–3 (a.e.t.)	Basel	Charmilles Stadium, Geneva
14:45	Fatton 5' (1:0); Ballaman 10' (2:0); Mezzena 99' (3:3); Fatton 91' (4:3)	Summary	22' (2:1) Hügi (II); 23' (2:2) Bader; 50' (2:3) Hügi (II)	Attendance: 13,000; Referee: (Switzerland) M. Baumberger Lausanne

== See also ==
- History of FC Basel
- List of FC Basel players
- List of FC Basel seasons

== Sources ==
- Rotblau: Jahrbuch Saison 2014/2015. Publisher: FC Basel Marketing AG. ISBN 978-3-7245-2027-6
- Die ersten 125 Jahre. Publisher: Josef Zindel im Friedrich Reinhardt Verlag, Basel. ISBN 978-3-7245-2305-5
- The FCB team 1952–53 at fcb-archiv.ch
- Switzerland 1952–53 by Erik Garin at Rec.Sport.Soccer Statistics Foundation
