= Walter Bielser =

Swiss football player (1929-2004)

Personal information
- Full name: Walter Bielser
- Date of birth: 20 May 1929
- Place of birth: Pratteln, Switzerland
- Date of death: 10 August 2004 (aged 75)
- Place of death: Pratteln, Switzerland
- Position: Forward

Youth career
- FC Pratteln
- FC Aesch

Senior career*
Years	Team	Apps	(Gls)
- FC Aesch
- Biel-Bienne
1951–1952	Lausanne-Sport		
1952–1954	FC Basel	47	(15)
1954–1955	Biel-Bienne	23	(5)
1955–1957	FC Basel	19	(4)
- * Club domestic league appearances and goals

Walter Bielser (20 May 1929 – 10 August 2004) was a Swiss footballer who played mainly as a forward, but also as a midfielder.

== Football career ==
Bielser played his youth football for FC Pratteln and then moved on to FC Aesch. As senior he played for Biel-Bienne and Lausanne-Sport before he moved to Basel for the first time. After two seasons he again played for Biel-Bienne before returning to Basel. Between 1952 and 1957 Bielser played 106 games for Basel and scored of 32 goals; 66 of these games were in the Nationalliga A, 8 in the Swiss Cup and 32 were friendly games. He scored 19 goals in the domestic league, 3 in the Cup and the other 10 during the test games.

The biggest success in his football career was as Basel won the championship title in the 1952–53 season. During this season Bielser played 21 league games and scored 9 goals for the club. Joint with Walter Bannwart and René Bader, Bielser was the team's second most successful league scorer with 9 goals for the club, behind Josef Hügi with 32.

== Private life ==
Bielser was the eldest of three children. He grew up in Pratteln and did his apprenticeship as a printer. Bielser married Heidi Schillinger and together they had three daughters. In 1960 he made himself self-employed and founded his own printing company, which he ran until his retirement.

== Honours ==
FC Basel

- Swiss League Champion: 1952–53

== Sources ==
- Rotblau: Jahrbuch Saison 2017/2018. Publisher: FC Basel Marketing AG. ISBN 978-3-7245-2189-1
- Die ersten 125 Jahre. Publisher: Josef Zindel im Friedrich Reinhardt Verlag, Basel. ISBN 978-3-7245-2305-5
- Verein "Basler Fussballarchiv" Homepage
