= Alfred Hartmann (footballer) =

Swiss former footballer

Personal information
- Full name: Alfred Hartmann
- Place of birth: Switzerland
- Positions: Midfielder; forward

Senior career*
Years	Team	Apps	(Gls)
1953–1955	FC Basel	3	(0)
- * Club domestic league appearances and goals

Alfred Hartmann is a Swiss former footballer who played in the 1950s, mainly as a forward but also as a midfielder.

Hartmann joined FC Basel's first team for their 1953–54 season under player-coach René Bader. He made his domestic league debut for the club in the home game at the Landhof on 13 September 1953 as Basel lost 1–3 against Chiasso.

Between 1953 and 1955, Hartmann played five games for Basel without scoring. Three were in the Nationalliga A, one in the Swiss Cup and the other was a friendly game.

== Sources ==
- Die ersten 125 Jahre. Publisher: Josef Zindel im Friedrich Reinhardt Verlag, Basel. ISBN 978-3-7245-2305-5
- Verein "Basler Fussballarchiv" Homepage
