= Benedikt Frey =

Swiss footballer (born 1930)

Personal information
- Full name: Benedikt Frey
- Date of birth: 25 August 1930 (age 96)
- Place of birth: Switzerland
- Position: Midfielder

Senior career*
Years	Team	Apps	(Gls)
1953–1954	FC Basel	1	(0)
1955–1956	CIBA		
1956–1957	FC Basel	6	(0)
1957–	Young Fellows Zürich		
- * Club domestic league appearances and goals

Benedikt Frey (born 25 August 1930) is a Swiss former footballer who played in the 1950s. He played as a midfielder.

Frey joined FC Basel's first team for their 1953–54 season under player-coach René Bader. After playing in four test matches, Frey played his domestic league debut for the club in the away game on 7 March 1954 as Basel played a 2–2 draw with FC Bern.

After playing this season with the club Frey spent one season playing company sports for Chemical Industry Basel (CIBA). Following this season he returned to his club of origin for another year. Between the years 1953 to 1954 and again from 1956 to 1957 Frey played a total of 12 games for Basel without scoring a goal. Seven of these games were in the Nationalliga A and five were friendly games.

Following his time with Basel Klauser moved on to play for Young Fellows Zürich.

== Sources ==
- Die ersten 125 Jahre. Publisher: Josef Zindel im Friedrich Reinhardt Verlag, Basel. ISBN 978-3-7245-2305-5
- Verein "Basler Fussballarchiv" Homepage
