= Walter Felber =

Swiss former footballer

Personal information
- Full name: Walter Felber
- Date of birth: unknown
- Place of birth: Switzerland
- Position: Midfielder

Senior career*
Years	Team	Apps	(Gls)
until 1953	FC Birsfelden		
1953–1954	FC Basel	2	(0)
- * Club domestic league appearances and goals

Walter Felber is a Swiss former footballer who played in the 1950s. He played as midfielder.

Felber joined FC Basel's first team from local team FC Birsfelden in for their 1953–54 season under player-coach René Bader. After playing in three test games, Felber played his domestic league debut for the club in the away game on 27 September 1953 as Basel were defeated 2–5 against Lausanne-Sport.

In his one season with the club Felber played a total of five games for Basel without scoring a goal. Two of these games were in the Nationalliga A and three were friendly games.

== Sources ==
- Die ersten 125 Jahre. Publisher: Josef Zindel im Friedrich Reinhardt Verlag, Basel. ISBN 978-3-7245-2305-5
- Verein "Basler Fussballarchiv" Homepage

(NB: Despite all efforts, the editors of these books and the authors in "Basler Fussballarchiv" have failed to be able to identify all the players, their date and place of birth or date and place of death, who played in the games during the early years of FC Basel)
