= René Klauser =

Swiss footballer (1929–2018)

Personal information
- Full name: René Klauser
- Date of birth: 8 March 1929
- Place of birth: Switzerland
- Date of death: 4 March 2018 (aged 88)
- Place of death: Allschwil, Switzerland
- Position: Defender

Senior career*
Years	Team	Apps	(Gls)
1953–1956	FC Basel	13	(0)
1958–	VfR Verein für Rasenspiele		
- * Club domestic league appearances and goals

René Klauser (8 March 1929 – 4 March 2018) was a Swiss footballer who played as defender.

Klauser joined Basel's first team for their 1953–54 season under player-coach René Bader. After playing in one test game, Klauser played his domestic league debut for the club in the away game at on 1 November 1953 as Basel lost 0–2 against La Chaux-de-Fonds.

Between the years 1953 and 1956 Klauser played a total of 20 games for Basel without scoring a goal. 13 of these games were in the Nationalliga A, two in the Swiss Cup and five were friendly games.

Following his time with FC Basel Klauser moved on to play for the regional team VfR Verein für Rasenspiele.

== Sources ==
- Die ersten 125 Jahre. Publisher: Josef Zindel im Friedrich Reinhardt Verlag, Basel. ISBN 978-3-7245-2305-5
- Verein "Basler Fussballarchiv" Homepage
