= Trofeo Cappelli e Ferrania =

Former association football competition

The Trofeo Cappelli e Ferrania (Central Europe Cup) was a winter association football tournament that took place twice, in Rome, Italy, in 1932 and 1934. The tournament organized by the Italian Football Federation, German Football Federation and Swiss Football Association. The competition, parallel to the Mitropa Cup, aimed to compare the best teams of the three countries mentioned, whereas Switzerland and Germany did not offer teams for the Central European Cup. The cup was finally attributed to the formation which had won the title three times or even twice consecutively. The winners of singolre editions would be awarded a trophy at a reduced size.

The tournament was contested by 4 teams, with semifinals, third place match and final. If any match ended in a draw, it was decided by penalties.

== Titles ==
Note that only the winner and runner-up is shown here. Some years there were more than two participating teams.

Year	Champion	Result	Runners-Up	Other participating teams
1932	(Italy) A.S. Roma	3–1	(Germany) TSV 1860 München	(Switzerland) FC Lausanne-Sport, (Italy) S.S. Lazio
1934	(Italy) A.S. Roma	2–1	(Italy) Genoa C.F.C.	(Switzerland) FC Bern 1894, (Germany) Stuttgarter Kickers
