= Eugen Büchel (footballer) =

Swiss footballer

Personal information
- Full name: Eugen Büchel
- Position: Midfielder

Senior career*
Years	Team	Apps	(Gls)
1950–1951	FC Nordstern Basel	3	(0)
1951–1952	FC Lausanne-Sport		
1952–1953	FC Basel	0	(0)
1953–1954	Young Fellows Zürich	22	(1)
1954–1955	FC Basel	1	(0)
- * Club domestic league appearances and goals

Eugen Büchel is a Swiss former footballer who played in the 1950s. He played as midfielder.

Büchel played for Nordstern Basel in the Nationalliga B (second tier of Swiss football) and then for Lausanne-Sport in the Nationalliga A (top tier). He joined FC Basel's first team in for their 1952–53 season under player-coach René Bader. In this season he played only two test matches and so he moved on to play for Young Fellows Zürich in the Nationalliga B. Here he played 22 domestic league matches, scoring one goal

Büchel again joined Basel's first team in for their 1954–55 season. Bader was still trainer of the team. Büchel played his domestic league debut for the club in the away game on 24 October 1954 as Basel were defeated 1–3 by Grasshopper Club.

In his two seasons with the club, Büchel played a total of four games for Basel scoring one goal. Solely one of these games were in the Nationalliga A, the other three were friendly games. He scored the afore mentioned goal during the test game against 1. FC Nürnberg on 21 March 1953.

== Sources ==
- Die ersten 125 Jahre. Publisher: Josef Zindel im Friedrich Reinhardt Verlag, Basel. ISBN 978-3-7245-2305-5
- Verein "Basler Fussballarchiv" Homepage

(NB: Despite all efforts, the editors of these books and the authors in "Basler Fussballarchiv" have failed to be able to identify all the players, their date and place of birth or date and place of death, who played in the games during the early years of FC Basel)
