= Werner Schley =

Swiss footballer (1935-2007)

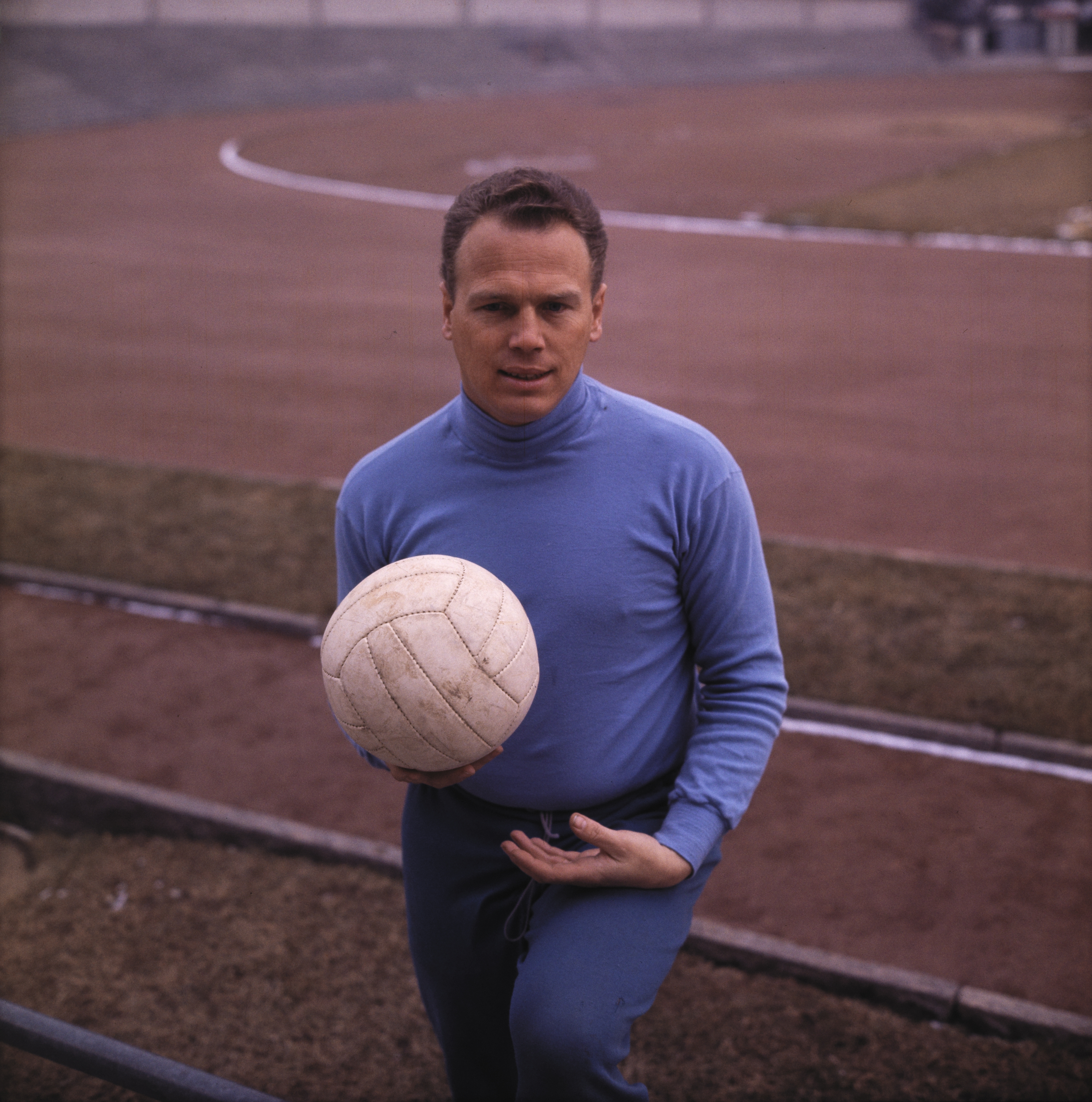
- Werner Schley in 1963

Personal information
- Full name: Werner Schley
- Date of birth: 25 January 1935
- Place of birth: Basel, Switzerland
- Date of death: 30 May 2007 (aged 72)
- Place of death: Mallorca, Spain
- Position: Goalkeeper

Youth career
- until 1951: FC Nordstern Basel

Senior career*
Years	Team	Apps	(Gls)
1951–1952	FC Nordstern Basel	16	(0)
1952–1953	FC Basel	19	(0)
1953–1954	Grasshopper Club Zürich	22	(0)
1954–1957	FC Basel	67	(0)
1958–1965	FC Zürich	145	(0)

International career
1959–1960	Switzerland	3	(0)

Managerial career
- 1966–1967: Grasshopper Club
- 1969–1970: Grasshopper Club
- 1970: FC Luzern
- 1976: FC Winterthur
- * Club domestic league appearances and goals

Werner Schley (born 25 January 1935 – 30 May 2007) was a Swiss footballer who played as a goalkeeper during the 1950s and 1960s. Schley was born in Basel and he died whilst he was in Mallorca, Spain.

== Football career ==
=== Club career ===
Schley played his youth football with Nordstern Basel and advanced to their first team in 1951. At that time they played in the Nationalliga B, the second tier of Swiss football. In that season Schley played between the posts in 16 of the 26 games, but could not save the team from suffering relegation.

Schley then joined FC Basel for their 1952–53 season with club legend René Bader as player-manager. After playing in five test matches, Schley played his domestic league debut for his new club in the away game on 31 August 1952 as Basel drew 2–2 with Young Boys. At the end of the season Schley had played in 19 of the league games and the team won their very first league title in 1953.

In 1953 Schley then signed for Grasshopper Club Zürich, but returned to FC Basel after just one season. Between the years 1952 to 1953 and again from 1954 to 1957 Schley played a total of 129 games for Basel. 86 of these games were in the Nationalliga A, ten in the Swiss Cup and 33 were friendly games.

In the summer of 1958 Schley then signed for FC Zürich and he remained with them for seven years. He advanced to become team captain in 1960 and held this position until his retirement. At the end of the season 1962–63 Zürich won the championship.

=== International experience ===
Schley earned three caps for the Swiss national team, making his international debut in a 1–5 defeat against Yugoslavia on 25 April 1959 in Basel. His last appearance was in a 3–1 win over the Netherlands in Zürich on 18 May 1960.

=== Coaching career ===
After his active football career, Schley coached Grasshopper during the 1966–67 Nationalliga A season together with Werner Brunner. Although they were replaced by Skiba the following season, both were reactivated for the 1969–70 Nationalliga A season. Schley later coached FC Luzern and FC Winterthur.

== Titles and honours ==
Basel

- Swiss League Champion: 1952–53

Zürich

- Swiss League Champion: 1962–63

== See also ==
- List of FC Basel players
- List of FC Basel seasons
- Football in Switzerland

== Notes ==
=== Sources ===
- Rotblau: Jahrbuch Saison 2017/2018. Publisher: FC Basel Marketing AG. ISBN 978-3-7245-2189-1
- Die ersten 125 Jahre. Publisher: Josef Zindel im Friedrich Reinhardt Verlag, Basel. ISBN 978-3-7245-2305-5
- Verein "Basler Fussballarchiv" Homepage
- 1952–53 at RSSSF
