= Kurt Thalmann =

Swiss footballer (1931-2018)

Personal information
- Full name: Kurt Julius Thalmann
- Date of birth: 3 November 1931
- Place of birth: Basel, Switzerland
- Date of death: 9 January 2018 (aged 86)
- Place of death: Basel
- Positions: Midfielder; forward

Youth career
- –1950: Concordia

Senior career*
Years	Team	Apps	(Gls)
1950–1951	Concordia	24	(5)
1951–1955	Basel	95	(17)
1955–1957	Cantonal Neuchâtel	44	(8)
1957–1958	Biel-Bienne	18	(1)
1958–1964	Solothurn		

International career
1954–1957	Switzerland reserves	5	(0)
- * Club domestic league appearances and goals

Kurt Thalmann (3 November 1931 – 9 January 2018) was a Swiss footballer. He played in the 1950s and early 1960s as midfielder or forward.

== Football career ==
=== Club football ===
Thalmann played his youth football by local club Concordia Basel and advanced to the first team in the 1950–51 season in the second tier of Swiss football. During this season Thalmann played 24 of the 26 league matches, scoring five goals, but he could not save the team from suffering relegation at the end of it.

During the summer of 1951 Thalmann moved to FC Basel, in Switzerland's top tier, under team manager Ernst Hufschmid for their 1950–51 season. Here Thalmann played as semi-profession footballer. After playing in six test matches Thalmann played his domestic league debut for his new club in the home game at the Landhof on 26 August 1950. He also scored his first league goal for the team as Basel won 6–1 against Young Fellows Zürich.

Thalmann spent the four years playing for Basel. He played a total of 149 games for Basel scoring a total of 34 goals. 95 of these games were in the Nationalliga A, 12 in the Swiss Cup and 42 were friendly games. He scored 17 goals in the domestic league, five in the cup and the other 12 were scored during the test games.

His biggest success was the championship title in Basel's 1952–53 season under player-coach René Bader. He was one of the youngest players in the team at that time and was known for his dribbling and his assists for the team's top scorer Josef "Seppi" Hügi to score his goals.

In the summer of 1955 Thalmann transferred to Cantonal Neuchâtel, who played in the second tier at that time, for two seasons. He then spent another season playing for Biel-Bienne, before moving on to play another six seasons in the second and third tier of Swiss football for Solothurn. In the season 1962–63 Thalmann and the team achieved promotion from the 1st League to the Nationalliga B. At the end of the following season Thalmann ended his active playing football career.

=== National team ===
Thalmann never made it to an appearance in the Switzerland national team, however, he did play five games for the reserve team.

== Private life ==
Thalmann married Suzanne and they had four children. He left Basel, when FC Basel team management would not help him find additional employment. He moved to Neuchâtel when management of the Cantonal Neuchâtel were able to employ him at the local gas works. Later the family returned to Basel as Walter Fust offered Thalmann work in his electrical shop. Fust would fire him, whereupon Thalmann was employed as a receptionist for the bank Credit Suisse until his retirement. His children would announce that after a pleasant football orientated life, Thalmann died at his home in Basel on 9 January 2018.

== Honours ==
Basel

- Swiss League champions: 1952–53

Solothurn

- Promotion 1st League Nationalliga B: 1962–63

== Notes ==
=== Sources ===
- Rotblau: Jahrbuch Saison 2017/2018. Publisher: FC Basel Marketing AG. ISBN 978-3-7245-2189-1
- Josef Zindel (2018). FC Basel 1893. Die ersten 125 Jahre (in German). Basel: Friedrich Reinhardt Verlag. ISBN 978-3-7245-2305-5.
- 1952–53 at RSSSF

== See also ==
- List of FC Basel players
- List of FC Basel seasons
