= György Mogoy =

Hungarian footballer (born 1924)

Personal information
- Date of birth: 14 August 1924
- Place of birth: Igal, Hungary
- Position: Defender

Senior career*
Years	Team	Apps	(Gls)
1947–1949	ŠK Slovan Bratislava		
1949–1950	Catania		
1950–1951	RCD Mallorca		
1951–1952	Grasshopper Club		
1952–1956	FC Basel	65	(6)
1956–1958	Nordstern Basel	39	(0)
- * Club domestic league appearances and goals

György Mogoy (born 14 August 1924) is a Hungarian former footballer who played in the 1940s and 1950s. He played mainly in the position as defender, but also as midfielder.

== Career ==
Mogoy was born in Igal, Hungary. He played three seasons for Czechoslovak club ŠK Slovan Bratislava and one season each for Italian club Catania and Spanisch club RCD Mallorca before he moved to Switzerland. Here he first played one season for Grasshopper Club Zürich.

Mogoy joined FC Basel's first team for their 1952–53 season under player-coach René Bader. After playing in five test matches, Mogoy played his domestic league debut for his new club in the away game on 31 August 1952 as Basel played a 2–2 draw with BSC Young Boys. He scored his first goal for his club per penalty on 19 April 1953 in the home game at the Landhof against Lausanne-Sport. Mogoy's biggest success was the championship title that season. Basel won 17 of the 26 league games, losing only once, and they won the championship four points clear of Young Boys in second position.

Between the years 1952 and 1956 Mogoy played a total of 113 games for Basel scoring a total of six goals. 65 of these games were in the Nationalliga A, eight in the Swiss Cup and 40 were friendly games. He scored his six goals all in the domestic league.

Following his time with FC Basel Mogoy moved on to play for Nordstern Basel and after two seasons with them he ended his active football career.

== Sources ==
- Rotblau: Jahrbuch Saison 2017/2018. Publisher: FC Basel Marketing AG. ISBN 978-3-7245-2189-1
- Die ersten 125 Jahre. Publisher: Josef Zindel im Friedrich Reinhardt Verlag, Basel. ISBN 978-3-7245-2305-5
- Verein "Basler Fussballarchiv" Homepage
