= Kurt Maurer =

Swiss football player (born 1926)

Personal information
- Full name: Kurt Maurer
- Date of birth: 1926
- Place of birth: Switzerland
- Position: Midfielder

Youth career
- until 1945: FC Basel

Senior career*
Years	Team	Apps	(Gls)
1945–1947	FC Basel	26	(1)
1947–1950	FC Bern	65	(4)
1950–1951	Urania Genève Sport	19	(1)
1951–1954	FC Basel	62	(1)
1954–1955	La Chaux-de-Fonds		
1955–1956	Nordstern Basel	3	(0)

International career
1953	Switzerland	1	(0)
- * Club domestic league appearances and goals

Kurt Maurer (born 1926) was a Swiss international footballer. He played in the position as midfielder.

== Club football ==
Maurer played his youth football by FC Basel and advanced to their first team in 1945 where he played for two seasons. During his first season Basel played in the second tear of Swiss football and won promotion to the Swiss Nationalliga A. Maurer played his debut in the domestic league game in the Landhof on 9 September 1945 in the game against SC Derendingen as Basel won 2–1. He scored his first goal for the team as Basel won 7–2 in the away game against Schaffhausen. In the next season (1946–47) Maurer and his club finished the league in fourth position and reached the final of the Swiss Cup. They won the final 3–0 against Lausanne Sports in the Stadion Neufeld on 7 April 1947, with Paul Stöcklin scoring all three goals. During this period Maurer played a total of 66 games for Basel scoring only the afore mentioned goal. 45 of these games were in the domestic league, seven in the Swiss Cup and 14 were friendly games.

In the summer of 1947 Maurer moved to FC Bern, where he stayed for three seasons. At the end of the 1947–48 season Bern were relegated. But the following season they won promotion straight away, only to finish the league in last position in the next season. After these three season of ups and downs Maurer moved on to play for Urania Genève Sport, but he stayed there just one season.

Maurer returned to his home team between 1951 and 1954. During this time he played a 62 domestic league games for Basel scoring one goal. The biggest success in his career was as Basel won the championship title in Basel's 1952–53 season. In his two periods for Basel Maurer played a total of 162 games for Basel scoring a total of 5 goals. 85 of these games were in the Nationalliga A, 22 in the Nationalliga B, 15 in the Swiss Cup and 40 were friendly games. He scored two goals in the domestic league and three were scored during the test games.

For the 1954–55 Nationalliga A season Maurer moved on to La Chaux-de-Fonds. That season La Chaux-de-Fonds won the double, the championship and the Swiss Cup, but it is not clear in how many games Mauer played. He ended his football after the following season, which he played with Nordstern Basel in the Nationalliga B.

== International football ==
In 1953 Maurer was called up to the Swiss national team. He played just one game for his country. This was on 27 June 1953 in the Rankhof Stadium against Denmark, the Danes winning 4–1.

== Titles and Honours ==
FC Basel

- Promotion to Nationalliga A: 1945–46
- Swiss Cup winner: 1946–47
- Swiss League Champion: 1952–53

FC Bern

- Promotion to Nationalliga A: 1948–49

FC La Chaux-de-Fonds

- Swiss League Champion: 1954–55
- Swiss Cup winner: 1954–55

== See also ==
- List of FC Basel players
- List of FC Basel seasons

== Sources ==
- Rotblau: Jahrbuch Saison 2017/2018. Publisher: FC Basel Marketing AG. ISBN 978-3-7245-2189-1
- Die ersten 125 Jahre. Publisher: Josef Zindel im Friedrich Reinhardt Verlag, Basel. ISBN 978-3-7245-2305-5
- Verein "Basler Fussballarchiv" Homepage
- 1946–47 at RSSSF
- 1952–53 at RSSSF
