= Walter Bannwart =

Swiss football player (born 1927)

Personal information
- Full name: Walter Bannwart
- Date of birth: 3 March 1927
- Position: Forward

Youth career
- until 1948: FC Basel

Senior career*
Years	Team	Apps	(Gls)
1949–1957	FC Basel	171	(44)

International career
1951	Switzerland	1	(0)
- * Club domestic league appearances and goals

Walter Bannwart (3 March 1927) was a Swiss footballer who played for FC Basel. He played mainly as a forward, but also as a midfielder.

== Football career ==
Between 1949 and 1957 Bannwart played 263 games for Basel and scored 64 goals; 171 games were in the Nationalliga A, 20 in the Swiss Cup and 72 were friendly games. He scored 44 goals in the domestic league, 6 in the Cup and the other 14 were scored in the friendliames.

His first game in the domestic league was on 20 November 1949 in a home game in the Stadion Schützenmatte against FC Bern. He scored twice as Basel won 3–1.

The biggest success in his football career was as Basel won the championship title in the 1952–53 season. During this season Bannwart played 26 league games and scored 9 goals for the club. Joint with Walter Bielser and René Bader, Bannwart was the team's second most successful league scorer that season, behind Josef Hügi with 32.

== International football ==
In 1951 Bannwart was called up to the Swiss national team. He played just one game for his country, in Switzerland's B team. This was on 15 September 1951 in the Wankdorf Stadium against Saarland. Saarland won the game 5–2.

== Sources ==
- Rotblau: Jahrbuch Saison 2017/2018. Publisher: FC Basel Marketing AG. ISBN 978-3-7245-2189-1
- Die ersten 125 Jahre. Publisher: Josef Zindel im Friedrich Reinhardt Verlag, Basel. ISBN 978-3-7245-2305-5
- Verein "Basler Fussballarchiv" Homepage
