= Fritz Wolf =

German gymnast

- Full name: Friedrich Franz Karl Wolf
- Born: 21 January 1880 Dassel, German Empire
- Died: 27 August 1961 (aged 81) Hannover, West Germany

Gymnastics career
- Discipline: Men's artistic gymnastics
- Country represented: Germany
- Club: Turn-Klubb zu Hannover 1858

Friedrich Franz Karl "Fritz" Wolf (21 January 1880 – 27 August 1961) was a German gymnast who competed in the 1908 Summer Olympics. In 1908 he finished fifth in the all-around competition.
