= Hans-Rudolf Fitze =

Swiss footballer (1925-1982)

Personal information
- Full name: Hans-Rudolf Fitze
- Date of birth: 3 September 1925
- Place of birth: Switzerland
- Date of death: 13 September 1982 (aged 57)
- Position: Defender

Youth career
- FC Birsfelden

Senior career*
Years	Team	Apps	(Gls)
until 1947	FC Birsfelden		
1947–1958	FC Basel	151	(1)
- * Club domestic league appearances and goals

Hans-Rudolf Fitze (* 3 September 1925; † 13 September 1982) was a Swiss footballer who played for nearly his entire football career for FC Basel. He played as defender

== Football career ==
In summer 1947 Fitze moved from his home club FC Birsfelden to FC Basel. Between the years 1947 and 1958 he played a total of 237 games for Basel scoring a total of four goals. 151 of these games were in the Nationalliga A, 24 in the Swiss Cup and 62 were friendly games. He scored one sole goal in the domestic league, two in the Cup and the other goal was scored during the test games.

Fitze played his debut in domestic league game on 12 September 1948 against Young Fellows Zürich in the Hardturm stadium. The game ended in a 3–3 draw. He scored his only domestic league goal for Basel on 6 May 1951 as Basel lost their home game against Cantonal Neuchatel. His biggest success in his career was as Basel won the championship title in Basel's 1952–53 season.

== Titles and Honours ==
- Swiss League Champion: 1952–53

== See also ==
- List of FC Basel players
- List of FC Basel seasons

== Sources ==
- Rotblau: Jahrbuch Saison 2017/2018. Publisher: FC Basel Marketing AG. ISBN 978-3-7245-2189-1
- Die ersten 125 Jahre. Publisher: Josef Zindel im Friedrich Reinhardt Verlag, Basel. ISBN 978-3-7245-2305-5
- Verein "Basler Fussballarchiv" Homepage
- 1952–53 at RSSSF
