= Marius Bruat =

French footballer (1930–2020)

Personal information
- Date of birth: 27 June 1930
- Place of birth: Mulhouse, France
- Date of death: 1 January 2020 (aged 89)
- Place of death: Colmar, France
- Height: 1.81 m (5 ft 11 in)
- Position: Midfielder

Senior career*
Years	Team	Apps	(Gls)
1950–1956	Sochaux		
1956–1959	Toulouse		
1959–1960	Red Star		
1960–1961	Rouen		

International career
1951	France B		
1953	France	1	(0)

Managerial career
- 1976–1978: SR Colmar
- 1978–1983: AS Sundhoffen
- * Club domestic league appearances and goals

Marius Bruat (27 June 1930 – 1 January 2020) was a French footballer who played as a midfielder.

== Biography ==
Bruat was recruited in 1950 to FC Sochaux-Montbéliard. He played for the France national team on 17 December 1953 in a World Cup qualifying match against Luxembourg.

In 1957, Lefèvre-Utile released a photo album of "French Football Champions", which featured Bruat.

In 1964, he was a finalist in the Coupe de la Ligue as coach of RC Strasbourg Alsace. He served as head coach of SR Colmar from 1976 to 1978, and then AS Sundhoffen from 1978 to 1983.

Bruat died on 1 January 2020, at the age of 89.
