= Hans Hügi =

Swiss footballer (1926-2000)

Personal information
- Full name: Hans Hügi
- Date of birth: 29 September 1926
- Place of birth: Switzerland
- Date of death: 1 February 2000 (aged 73)
- Position: Defender

Senior career*
Years	Team	Apps	(Gls)
1947–1959	FC Basel	226	(38)
1959–1961	Young Fellows Zürich		
- * Club domestic league appearances and goals

Hans Hügi, known as Hügi (I), (29 September 1926 - 1 February 2000) was a Swiss footballer who played twelve years for FC Basel and two seasons for Young Fellows Zürich as defender.

== Football career ==
Between the years 1947 and 1959 Hügi (I) played a total of 296 games for Basel scoring a total of 56 goals. 226 of these games were in the Nationalliga A, 24 in the Swiss Cup and 76 were friendly games. He scored 38 goal in the domestic league, five in the Swiss Cup and the other 14 were scored during the test games.

Hügi (I) played his debut in domestic league game in the Landhof on 23 May 1948 in the game against Locarno. Basel won the game 2–1 and it was Hügi (I) who scored the winning goal in the last minute of the game. Two weeks later in the home match against Cantonal Neuchatel he scored two goals in the 4–1 win and again one week later in Stadion Brühl against Grenchen Hügi (I) scored the first goal în the 2–2 away draw. This meant that he had scored four goals in his first four games. The biggest success in his career was as Basel won the championship title in Basel's 1952–53 season.

== Titles and Honours ==
- Swiss League Champion: 1952–53

== See also ==
- List of FC Basel players
- List of FC Basel seasons

== Sources ==
- Rotblau: Jahrbuch Saison 2017/2018. Publisher: FC Basel Marketing AG. ISBN 978-3-7245-2189-1
- Die ersten 125 Jahre. Publisher: Josef Zindel im Friedrich Reinhardt Verlag, Basel. ISBN 978-3-7245-2305-5
- Verein "Basler Fussballarchiv" Homepage
- 1952–53 at RSSSF
