= Jacques Fatton =

Swiss footballer (1925-2011)

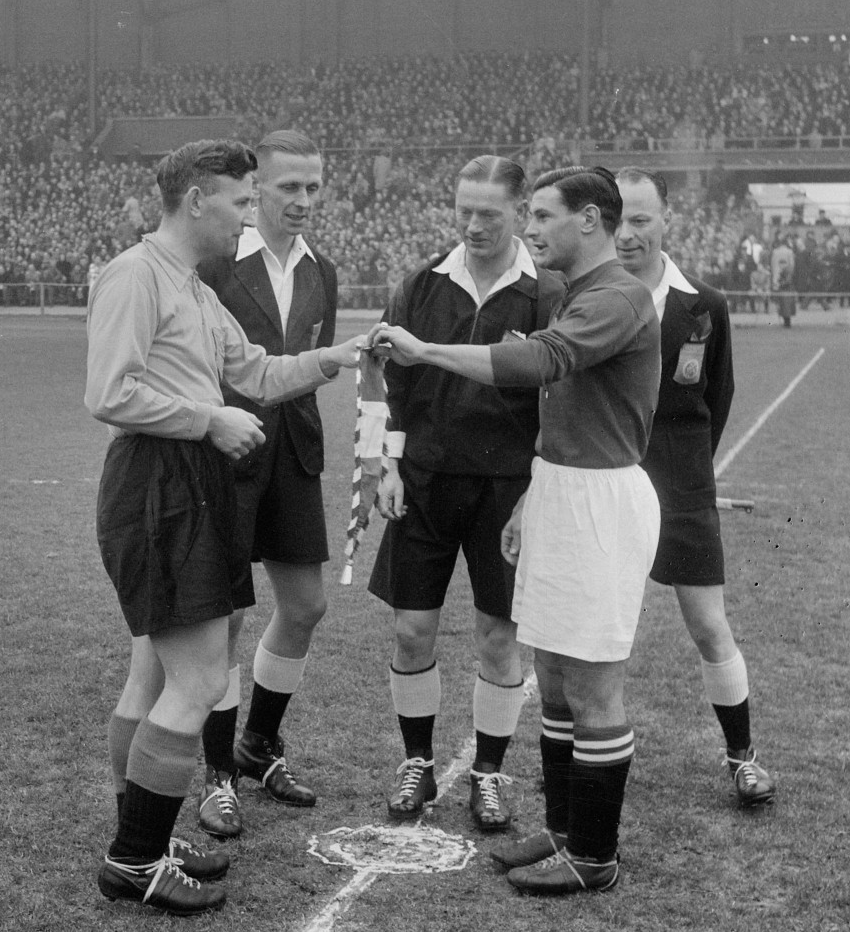
- Abe Lenstra and Fatton (right), March 1953

Personal information
- Date of birth: 19 December 1925
- Place of birth: Exincourt, France
- Date of death: 26 July 2011 (aged 85)
- Place of death: Geneva, Switzerland
- Position: Forward

Senior career*
Years	Team	Apps	(Gls)
1943–1954	Servette		
1954–1957	Lyon	82	(35)
1957–1963	Servette	109	(90)

International career
1946–1955	Switzerland	53	(28)
- * Club domestic league appearances and goals

Jacques Fatton (19 December 1925 – 26 July 2011) was a Swiss footballer who played as a forward.

== Career ==
Fatton, who was born in Exincourt, France, was capped 53 times and scored 28 goals for the Switzerland national team. He played in two FIFA World Cups, scoring twice in 1950 and once in 1954.

During his club career, Fatton played for Servette and Lyon. He died in Geneva, Switzerland.
