= 1952–53 Nationalliga A =

Swiss football season

Nationalliga A
- Season: 1952–53
- Champions: Basel
- Relegated: Lugano; Locarno
- Top goalscorer: Josef Hügi (Basel); Eugen Meier (Young Boys) both 30 goals

Nationalliga B
- Season: 1952–53
- Champions: Luzern
- Promoted: Luzern; Biel-Bienne
- Relegated: SC Zug; Étoile-Sporting
- Top goalscorer: Jacques Guhl (Malley); 26 goals

The following is the summary of the Swiss National League in the 1952–53 football season, both Nationalliga A and Nationalliga B. This was the 56th season of top-tier and the 55th season of second-tier football in Switzerland.

== Overview ==
The Swiss Football Association (ASF/SFV) had 28 member clubs at this time which were divided into two divisions of 14 teams each. The teams played a double round-robin to decide their table positions. Two points were awarded for a win and one point was awarded for a draw. The top tier (NLA) was contested by the top 12 teams from the previous season and the two newly promoted teams FC Fribourg and FC Grenchen. The last two teams in the league table at the end of the season were to be relegated.

The second-tier (NLB) was contested by the two teams that had been relegated from the NLA at the end of the last season, these were FC Biel-Bienne and FC Young Fellows, the ten teams that had been in third to twelfth position last season and the two newly promoted teams Wil and Solothurn. The top two teams at the end of the season would be promoted to the 1953–54 NLA and the two last placed teams would be relegated to the 1953–54 Swiss 1. Liga.

== Nationalliga A ==
=== Teams, locations ===
Team	Based in	Canton	Stadium	Capacity
FC Basel	Basel	Basel-Stadt	Landhof	4,000
AC Bellinzona	Bellinzona	Ticino	Stadio Comunale Bellinzona	5,000
FC Bern	Bern	Bern	Stadion Neufeld	14,000
FC Chiasso	Chiasso	Ticino	Stadio Comunale Riva IV	4,000
Grasshopper Club Zürich	Zürich	Zürich	Hardturm	20,000
FC Fribourg	Fribourg	Fribourg	Stade Universitaire	9,000
FC Grenchen	Grenchen	Solothurn	Stadium Brühl	10,900
FC La Chaux-de-Fonds	La Chaux-de-Fonds	Neuchâtel	Centre Sportif de la Charrière	10,000
FC Lausanne-Sport	Lausanne	Vaud	Pontaise	30,000
FC Locarno	Locarno	Ticino	Stadio comunale Lido	5,000
FC Lugano	Lugano	Ticino	Cornaredo Stadium	6,330
Servette FC	Geneva	Geneva	Stade des Charmilles	27,000
BSC Young Boys	Bern	Bern	Wankdorf Stadium	56,000
FC Zürich	Zürich	Zürich	Letzigrund	25,000

=== Final league table ===
Pos	Team	Pld	W	D	L	GF	GA	GD	Pts	Qualification
1	Basel	26	17	8	1	72	38	+34	42	Swiss Champions
2	Young Boys	26	16	6	4	61	39	+22	38	Swiss Cup winners
3	Grasshopper Club	26	14	4	8	73	39	+34	32	
4	Servette	26	12	8	6	61	38	+23	32	
5	Chiasso	26	9	8	9	38	52	−14	26	
6	Bellinzona	26	9	7	10	45	45	0	25	
7	Lausanne-Sport	26	8	8	10	52	45	+7	24	
8	La Chaux-de-Fonds	26	8	7	11	53	61	−8	23	
9	Fribourg	26	10	3	13	35	53	−18	23	
10	Zürich	26	7	8	11	45	48	−3	22	
11	Bern	26	6	10	10	40	53	−13	22	
12	Grenchen	26	6	8	12	38	54	−16	20	Play-out against relegation
13	Lugano	26	5	10	11	38	53	−15	20	Play-out against relegation
14	Locarno	26	5	5	16	33	66	−33	15	Relegated to 1953–54 Nationalliga B

Source: RSSSF
Rules for classification: 1) Points; 2) Goal difference within the league, however with play-off for qualifiers;

This was Basel's first championship title.

=== Results ===
Home \ Away	BAS	BEL	BER	CDF	CHI	FRI	GCZ	GRE	LS	LOC	LUG	SER	YB	ZÜR
Basel		2–2	2–2	3–2	4–1	1–0	1–0	6–2	1–1	8–1	1–1	1–0	1–0	5–1
Bellinzona	2–3		5–2	4–0	1–1	2–0	3–2	3–1	2–2	1–4	2–2	1–3	0–0	2–2
Bern	1–2	1–1		3–1	0–0	5–2	1–6	3–0	2–0	2–2	1–1	3–2	2–3	3–3
La Chaux-de-Fonds	2–6	0–1	2–0		4–0	1–4	3–3	3–3	3–1	1–0	6–2	1–1	3–3	2–1
Chiasso	4–3	1–4	2–3	2–2		1–0	1–4	1–0	1–0	3–1	5–2	2–1	1–1	3–1
Fribourg	0–1	1–0	1–0	2–2	2–2		3–1	0–0	2–0	4–1	1–3	2–5	0–2	2–1
Grasshopper Club	4–5	3–1	4–0	2–1	0–0	6–0		2–3	3–1	7–0	3–1	2–0	2–0	2–3
Grenchen	2–3	2–1	0–0	0–1	2–2	5–1	0–4		0–0	0–0	4–1	1–3	2–3	2–2
Lausanne-Sports	1–2	2–1	4–2	1–3	7–1	4–1	2–2	0–0		0–2	1–1	3–1	6–1	5–4
Locarno	3–5	2–3	1–1	2–1	1–0	1–2	0–2	4–5	2–2		0–1	1–1	1–3	2–1
Lugano	0–0	1–2	4–0	5–5	0–1	0–1	4–4	0–1	1–6	2–1		1–1	1–2	2–0
Servette	3–3	3–0	2–0	7–1	1–1	4–2	1–5	4–0	3–1	6–0	0–0		3–3	1–1
Young Boys	2–2	3–1	2–2	3–2	5–2	5–1	2–0	3–1	2–0	2–0	4–1	2–3		4–2
Zürich	1–1	2–0	1–1	2–1	3–0	0–1	3–0	4–2	2–2	3–1	1–1	1–2	0–1	

Source: RSSSF
Legend: Blue = home team win; Yellow = draw; Red = away team win.

=== Topscorers ===
Rank	Player	Nat.	Goals	Club
1.	Josef Hügi	(Switzerland)	32	Basel
1.	Eugen Meier	(Switzerland)	32	Young Boys
3.	Roger Vonlanthen	(Switzerland)	23	Grasshopper Club
4.	Jacques Fatton	(Switzerland)	22	Servette
5.	Robert Ballaman	(Switzerland)	16	Grasshopper Club
5.	Miodrag Glišović	(Socialist Federal Republic of Yugoslavia)	16	Lausanne-Sport
7.	Ferdinando Riva	(Switzerland)	15	Chiasso
8.	Ledio Zanetti	(Switzerland)	14	Bellinzona
8.	Hans Hagen	(Switzerland)	14	Grasshopper Club
8.	Raymond Morand	(Switzerland)	14	La Chaux-de-Fonds
8.	Heinz Pfister	(Switzerland)	14	Grenchen

== Nationalliga B ==
=== Teams, locations ===
Team	Based in	Canton	Stadium	Capacity
FC Aarau	Aarau	Aargau	Stadion Brügglifeld	9,240
FC Biel-Bienne	Biel/Bienne	Bern	Stadion Gurzelen	5,500
FC Cantonal Neuchâtel	Neuchâtel	Neuchâtel	Stade de la Maladière	25,500
FC Étoile-Sporting	La Chaux-de-Fonds	Neuchâtel	Les Foulets / Terrain des Eplatures	1,000 / 500
FC Luzern	Lucerne	Lucerne	Stadion Allmend	25,000
ES FC Malley	Malley	Vaud	Centre sportif de la Tuilière	1,500
FC Schaffhausen	Schaffhausen	Schaffhausen	Stadion Breite	7,300
FC Solothurn	Solothurn	Solothurn	Stadion FC Solothurn	6,750
FC St. Gallen	St. Gallen	St. Gallen	Espenmoos	11,000
Urania Genève Sport	Genève	Geneva	Stade de Frontenex	4,000
FC Wil	Wil	St. Gallen	Sportpark Bergholz	6,048
FC Winterthur	Winterthur	Zürich	Schützenwiese	8,550
FC Young Fellows	Zürich	Zürich	Utogrund	2,850
SC Zug	Zug	Zug	Herti Allmend Stadion	6,000

=== Final league table ===
Pos	Team	Pld	W	D	L	GF	GA	GD	Pts	Qualification
1	Luzern	24	15	5	4	56	25	+31	35	NLB champions and promoted to 1953–54 Nationalliga A
2	FC Biel-Bienne	24	15	4	5	57	30	+27	34	Promoted to 1953–54 Nationalliga A
3	ES FC Malley	24	12	7	5	59	40	+19	31	
4	FC Winterthur	24	13	5	6	50	42	+8	31	
5	FC St. Gallen	24	11	5	8	43	40	+3	27	
6	FC Cantonal Neuchâtel	24	10	5	9	35	34	+1	25	
7	FC Solothurn	24	10	3	11	37	37	0	23	
8	FC Wil	24	7	7	10	36	36	0	21	
9	Urania Genève Sport	24	8	3	13	46	48	−2	19	
10	Young Fellows Zürich	24	7	5	12	33	42	−9	19	
11	FC Schaffhausen	24	6	5	13	28	43	−15	17	
12	FC Aarau	24	7	3	14	29	62	−33	17	
13	SC Zug	24	5	3	16	30	60	−30	13	Relegated to 1953–54 1. Liga
14	FC Étoile-Sporting	0	0	0	0	0	0	0	0	Withdrew and were relegated to 1953–54 1. Liga

Source: RSSSF
Rules for classification: 1) Points; 2) Goal difference within the league, however with play-off for qualifiers;

== Further in Swiss football ==
- 1952–53 Swiss Cup
- 1952–53 Swiss 1. Liga

== Sources ==
- Switzerland 1952–53 at RSSSF

Preceded by 1951–52	Nationalliga seasons in Switzerland	Succeeded by 1953–54
