= Stadion Neufeld =

Multi-use stadium in Bern, Switzerland

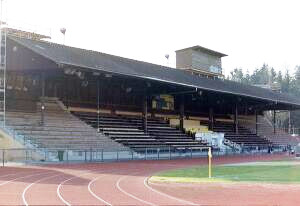
- Interactive map of Stadion Neufeld
- Full name: Stadion Neufeld
- Location: Neufeld, Bern, Switzerland
- Coordinates: 46°57′39″N 7°25′53″E
- Owner: Genossenschaft Stadion Neufeld (-2008), Stadtbauten Bern (StaBe) (since 2008)
- Operator: Stade de Suisse Wankdorf Nationalstadion AG (since 2009)
- Capacity: 14,000
- Record attendance: 28,000 (1948: Swiss Cup FC Basel-Lausanne Sports)

Construction
- Opened: 1924

Tenants
- FC Bern, BSC Young Boys, Frauenfussballclub Bern, Gymnastische Gesellschaft Bern

Stadion Neufeld is a multi-use stadium in Bern, Switzerland, with a capacity of 14,000 spectators, including 3000 seats. It is the home ground of FC Bern and the junior team of BSC Young Boys. Historically, it hosted the 1954 European Athletics Championships.

BSC Young Boys used the stadium from 2001/02 to 2004/05, during the renovation of Wankdorf Stadion.

== See also ==
- List of football stadiums in Switzerland
