= Josef Hügi =

Swiss footballer (1930–1995)

Personal information
- Date of birth: 23 January 1930
- Place of birth: Riehen, Switzerland
- Date of death: 16 April 1995 (aged 65)
- Place of death: Basel, Switzerland
- Height: 1.73 m (5 ft 8 in)
- Position: Striker

Senior career*
Years	Team	Apps	(Gls)
1948–1962	FC Basel	320	(244)
1962–1963	FC Zürich	2	(0)
1963–1964	FC Porrentruy	33	(19)
1964–1965	FC Laufen		
Total		355	(263)

International career
1951–1960	Switzerland	34	(22)
- * Club domestic league appearances and goals

Josef Hügi (23 January 1930 – 16 April 1995) was a Swiss international footballer who played as a striker from the late 1940s to the early 1960s.

== Career ==
Hügi was born in the town of Riehen on 23 January 1930 and played football from an early age but did not start to take the sport all that seriously until he went to the University of Basel in the late 1940s. His first professional club was FC Basel, whom he signed for in 1948. He would spend the next fourteen years of his life playing for the RotBlau, playing 320 league matches and scoring 244 goals. In 1962, he signed for FC Zürich but he played just two games there and went on to spend the rest of his career in the lower divisions with FC Porrentruy and FC Laufen. He became a coach at FC Basel after his retirement from playing.

He was capped 34 times for the Swiss national team between 1951 and 1960, scoring 22 goals. At the 1954 FIFA World Cup, he scored six goals, tied second-best for the tournament, which makes him the all-time top goalscorer for Switzerland in World Cups.

== Honours ==
Basel

- Swiss Super League: 1952–53

== See also ==
- List of FIFA World Cup top goalscorers
