= René Bader =

Swiss footballer (1922-1995)

Personal information
- Date of birth: 7 August 1922
- Place of birth: Basel, Switzerland
- Date of death: 1995 (aged 72–73)
- Place of death: Basel, Switzerland
- Position: Forward

Senior career*
Years	Team	Apps	(Gls)
1946–1953	FC Basel		

International career
1946–1953	Switzerland	22	(1)

Managerial career
- 1952–1955: FC Basel
- 1958–1959: FC Basel
- * Club domestic league appearances and goals

René Bader (7 August 1922 – 1995) was a Swiss football player and coach.

== Career ==
A forward, Bader played for FC Basel between 1946 and 1953. In 1947 Basel won the Swiss Cup as they beat Lausanne-Sport 3–0 in the final at the Stadion Neufeld in Bern. Paul Stöcklin scored two goals and Bader the other.

Between 1952 and 1955 and again during the season 1958–59 Bader was trainer of the Basel team. Basel won their first league title in 1953, with club legend Bader as player-manager. Basel ended the season three points ahead of BSC Young Boys. The team line up under Manager Bader that year was Werner Schley, Walter Müller, Walter Bannwart, Walter Bielser, Werner Bopp, Hansruedi Fitze, Hans Hügi, Josef "Sepp" Hügi, René Bader, Kurt Maurer, Georges Mogoy, Peter Redolfi, Kurt Thalmann, Hans Weber.

Bader played for the Switzerland national team in the 1950 FIFA World Cup in Brazil. He scored the first goal in the game that Switzerland won 2–1 against Mexico in Estádio dos Eucaliptos, Porto Alegre, on 2 July. The Swiss finished in third position in the group and therefore dropped out of the competition.

== Honours ==
=== As player ===
Basel

- Swiss Cup: 1947

=== As player-manager ===
Basel

- Swiss Super League: 1952–53
