= 1950–51 FC Basel season =

FC Basel
1950–51 season
- Chairman: Jules Düblin
- Manager: Ernst Hufschmid
- Ground: Landhof, Basel
- Nationalliga A: 4th
- Swiss Cup: Round 5
- Top goalscorer: League: Josef Hügi (21); All: Josef Hügi (23)
- Highest home attendance: 8,000 on 6 May 1951 vs Cantonal Neuchatel
- Lowest home attendance: 3,000 on 30 December 1950 vs Bellinzona
- Average home league attendance: 5,153

The 1950–51 season was Fussball Club Basel 1893's 57th season in their existence. It was their fifth season in Nationalliga A the top flight of Swiss football following their promotion from the Nationalliga B in the season 1945–46. For the second consecutive season Basel played their home games in the Stadion Schützenmatte in the Bachletten quartier in the southwestern edge of the city of Basel. Jules Düblin was the club's chairman for the fifth successive season.

== Overview ==
Ernst Hufschmid, who had functioned as player-coach the previous three seasons, continued in this function this year. Curiosity, Hufschmid played only in one match this season and it was his last active match as player and this he played as goalkeeper. On 10 August 1950 Football Club Basel played against Eishockey Club Basel. This was a return game for the ice hockey game EHC-FCB in December 1949. The football team won the football match 14–5. Goalkeeper Walter Müller played as striker and he scored six goals.

Basel played a total of 40 games in this season. Of these 26 games were in the domestic league, three games were in the Swiss Cup and eleven were test games. The test games resulted with eight victories, one was drawn and two ended with defeats. In total, including the test games and the cup competition, they won 22 games, drew five and lost 13 times. In the 41 games they scored 106 goals and conceded 75.

As in the previous seasons, there were fourteen teams contesting in the 1950–51 Nationalliga A and the bottom two teams in the table to be relegated. Basel played a mediocre season and throughout the season they were in the midfield of the table. At the end of the season Basel won their last two games and finished in fourth position level on points with Zürich and Servette, six points behind the new champions Lausanne-Sport. Basel won 12 games, drew four and were defeated ten times, they scored 62 goals and conceded 51 as they gained their 28 points. Josef "Seppe" Hügi was the team's best scorer and 2nd best league scorer. He netted 21 league goals. Paul Stöcklin was the team's second best goal getter and 12th best league scorer with 12 goals.

In the 3rd principal round of the Swiss Cup on 29 October 1950 in the away match against FC Münchenstein Gottlieb Stäuble had a good day and scored a hat-trick as the team won 6–0 to qualify for the next round. In round 4 Basel were drawn away against Biel-Bienne and this too was won. In round 5 Basel were drawn at home against Locarno. In the 65th minute goalkeeper Walter Müller and defender Werner Wenk were both sent off and Locarno won the game. Locarno later advanced to the final, but here were defeated by La Chaux-de-Fonds who thus won the trophy.

== Players ==
The following is the list of the Basel first team squad during the season 1950–51. The list includes players that were in the squad on the day that the Nationalliga A season started on 3 September 1950 but subsequently left the club after that date.

Note: Flags indicate national team as defined under FIFA eligibility rules; some limited exceptions apply. Players may hold more than one non-FIFA nationality.

No.	Pos.	Nation	Player
—	GK	SUI	Oswald Capra
—	GK	SUI	Walter Müller
—	GK	SUI	Jean Presset
—	DF	SUI	Werner Bopp
—	DF	SUI	Hans-Rudolf Fitze
—	DF	SUI	Ernst Hufschmid (Player-coach)
—	DF	SUI	Hans Hügi
—	MF	SUI	Max Sutter
—	MF	SUI	Hans Weber
—	MF	SUI	Leo Baumgratz
—	MF	SUI	Fritz Hartmann (from Nordstern Basel)

No.	Pos.	Nation	Player
—	MF	SUI	Eugen Müller
—	MF	FRA	Pierre Redolfi
—	MF	SUI	Gottlieb Stäuble
—	MF	SUI	Werner Wenk
—	MF	SUI	Willy Zingg
—	FW	SUI	René Bader
—	FW	SUI	Walter Bannwart
—	FW	SUI	Peter Baumgartner
—	FW	SUI	Erich Grether
—	FW	SUI	Josef Hügi
—	FW	SUI	Marcel Leisinger
—	FW	SUI	Paul Stöcklin

Players who left the squad

Note: Flags indicate national team as defined under FIFA eligibility rules; some limited exceptions apply. Players may hold more than one non-FIFA nationality.

No.	Pos.	Nation	Player
—	MF	SUI	Otto Krieg (to FC Birsfelden)
—	MF	SUI	Louis Schenker (to FC Luzern)

No.	Pos.	Nation	Player
—	FW	FRA	René Hebinger (to FC Mulhouse)
—	FW	SUI	Albert Meier
—	FW	SUI	Otto Soltermann (to FC Birsfelden)

== Results ==
=== Legend ===
Win Draw Loss Postponed

=== Friendly matches ===
==== Pre-season ====
5 August 1950 Pre-season	Basel (Switzerland)	6–4	(Germany) Freiburger FC	Stadion Schützenmatte, Basel
	Leisinger (2x); Bader (2x); Bannwart (1x); Hügi (II) (1x)	Summary	(3x) Mokros (1x) Faber (1x) Lehmann	Attendance: 1,600; Referee: (Switzerland) von Wartburg Bern

10 August 1950 Pre-season	Basel (Switzerland)	14–5	(Switzerland) EHC Basel	Stadion Schützenmatte, Basel
18:30	Müller 20' (1:0); Hügi (II) (2:0); Müller (3:0); Bannwart (4:1); Hügi (II) (5:1); Müller (6:1); Bopp (7:1); Müller (8:1); Müller (9:1); Müller (10:2); Hügi (I) (11:3); Bader (12:3); Hügi (I) (13:3); Hügi (I) (14:3)	Summary	(3:1) Härter (9:2) Härter (10:3) Härter (14:4) Beer (14:5) Wiesner	Attendance: 750; Referee: (Switzerland) A. Aegerter

13 August 1950 Pre-season	Basel (Switzerland)	1–0	(Switzerland) Grenchen	Sportplatz Nau, Laufen
	Leisinger 85' (1:0)	Summary		Referee: (Switzerland) Dörflinger Grenchen

19 August 1950 Pre-season	Basel (Switzerland)	2–3	(Germany) Karlsruher FV	Hörnli, Basel
	Hügi (I) 12' (1:0) (o.g. 2:3)	Summary	(1:1); 22' (1:2); 35' (1:3)

20 August 1950 Pre-season	Wil (Switzerland)	2–2	(Switzerland) Basel	Lindengut, Wil
16:00	Hagen (II) 12' (1:0); Hagen (II) (2:0)	Summary	(2:1) Wenk (pen. 2:2) Wenk	Attendance: 2,200; Referee: (Switzerland) Schären Winterthur

26 August 1950 Pre-season	Basel (Switzerland)	2–1	(Germany) Berliner SV 1892	Stadion Schützenmatte, Basel
	Bader 25' (1:1); Bader 81 pen. 2:1'	Summary	20' (0:1) Langetal	Attendance: 2,500; Referee: (Switzerland) E. Ruefer Bern

16 September 1950 Mid-season	Fribourg (Switzerland)	1–2	(Switzerland) Basel	Stade Universitaire, Freiburg
	Kaeslin 51' (1:0)	Summary	65' (1:1) Bopp; 88' (1:2) Stäuble	Attendance: 1,000; Referee: (Switzerland) Dörflinger Grenchen

==== Winter break to end of season ====
11 February 1951 Winter break	Basel (Switzerland)	4–3	(Switzerland) Concordia Basel	Stadion Schützenmatte, Basel
	Wenk 5' (1:0); Leisinger 25' (2:0); Leisinger 43' (3:0); Stöcklin 75' (pen. 4:2)	Summary	53' (3:1) Girod; 65' (3:2) Rinderknecht; 78' (4:3) Girod	Attendance: 650; Referee: (Switzerland) Niederhauser Bern

14 April 1951 Mid-season	Basel (Switzerland)	0–2	(France) Olympique de Marseille	Stadion Schützenmatte, Basel
16:15		Summary	3' (0:1) Andersson; 68' (0:2) Andersson	Attendance: 2,200; Referee: (Switzerland) Scherz Bern

22 May 1951 Mid-season	Basel (Switzerland)	1–0	(England) Bolton Wanderers	Stadion Schützenmatte, Basel
18:30	Hügi (II) 88' (2:0)	Summary		Attendance: 5,200; Referee: (Switzerland) Schürch Winterthur

6 June 1951 Mid-season	Basel (Switzerland)	2–0	(England) Blackpool	Stadion Schützenmatte, Basel
19:00	Ballaman 19' (1:0); Stöcklin 32' (2;0)	Summary		Attendance: 10,000; Referee: (Switzerland) Paul Wyssling Zürich

=== Nationalliga ===
==== League matches ====
3 September 1950 Round 1	Biel-Bienne	1–1	Basel	Stadion Schützenmatte, Basel
15:00	Rösch 60' (1:1)	Summary	49' (0:1) Bannwart	Attendance: 4,500; Referee: (Switzerland) E. Guidi Bellinzona

9 September 1950 Round 2	Basel	5–1	Young Boys	Stadion Schützenmatte, Basel
15:00	Hügi (II) 31' (1:1); 40' (o.g. 2:1); Stäuble 62' (3:1); Bannwart 64' (4:1); 72' (o.g. 5:1)	Summary	30' (0:1) Beerli	Attendance: 5,500; Referee: (Switzerland) Lutz Geneva

24 September 1950 Round 3	Servette	2–2	Basel	Charmilles Stadium, Geneva
15:00	Jerusalem 30' (1:0); Fatton 75' (2:1)	Summary	41' (1:1) Bannwart; 77' (2:2) Hügi (II)	Attendance: 10,000; Referee: (Switzerland) Scherz Bern

1 October 1950 Round 4	Basel	4–1	La Chaux-de-Fonds	Stadion Schützenmatte, Basel
15:00	Weber 21' (1:1); Hügi (II) 69' (2:1); Weber 78' (3:1); Stäuble 79' (4:1); Wenk (red card)	Summary	2' (0:1) Tschann	Attendance: 7,300; Referee: (Switzerland) E. Ruefer Bern

8 October 1950 Round 5	Zürich	2–1	Basel	Letzigrund, Zürich
15:15	Andres 17' (1:0); Bopp 44' (o.g. 2:1)	Summary	30' (1:1) Stäuble	Attendance: 6,000; Referee: (Switzerland) von Gunten Bern

22 October 1950 Round 6	Basel	1–1	Lugano	Stadion Schützenmatte, Basel
15:00	Bader 37' (1:0)	Summary	77' (1:1) Kauer	Attendance: 7,300; Referee: (Switzerland) M. Baumberger Lausanne

5 November 1950 Round 7	Locarno	5–0	Basel	Stadio del Lido, Locarno
15:00	Santini 35' (1:0); Roggero 58' (2:0); Roggero 60' (3:0); Roggero 75' (4:0); Ruch 86' (pen. 5:0)	Summary		Attendance: 2,300; Referee: (Switzerland) von Wartburg Bern

19 November 1950 Round 8	Cantonal Neuchatel	0–2	Basel	Stade de la Maladière (1924), Neuchâtel
14:30		Summary	30' (0:1) Stöcklin; 38' (0:2) Bannwart; (yellow card) Stäuble	Attendance: 3,200; Referee: (Switzerland) Niederhauser Bern

26 November 1950 Round 9	Basel	P–P	Grenchen	Stadion Schützenmatte, Basel
		[ Summary]

10 December 1950 Round 10	Lausanne-Sport	3–1	Basel	Olympique de la Pontaise, Lausanne
14:30	Maillard (II) 27' (1:1); Bocquet 44' (pen. 2:1); Bocquet 81' (pen. 3:1)	Summary	7' (0:1) Stäuble	Attendance: 6,000; Referee: (Switzerland) E. Ruefer Bern

17 December 1950 Round 11	Basel	3–0	Young Fellows Zürich	Stadion Schützenmatte, Basel
14:30	Hügi (II) 46' (1:0); Bannwart 79' (2:0); Wenk 84' (3:0)	Summary		Attendance: 4,400; Referee: (Switzerland) Lutz Geneva

24 December 1950 Round 12	Chiasso	P–P	Basel	Stadio Via Comacini, Chiasso
		[ Summary]

30 December 1950 Round 13	Basel	3–0	Bellinzona	Stadion Schützenmatte, Basel
14:45	Hügi (II) 14' (1:0); Stöcklin 52' (pen. 2:0); Hügi (II) 60' (3:0)	Summary		Attendance: 3,000; Referee: (Switzerland) Dörflinger Grenchen

27 January 1951 Round 9	Basel	0–2	Grenchen	Stadion Schützenmatte, Basel
15:00		Summary	58' (0:1) Righetti; 72' (0:2) Bohnen	Attendance: 3,500; Referee: (Switzerland) Paul Wyssling Zürich

3 March 1951 Round 14	Basel	2–2	Biel-Bienne	Stadion Schützenmatte, Basel
16:00	Stöcklin 12' (1:0); Bader 67' (2:2)	Summary	56' (1:1) Rösch; 63' (1:2) Rösch	Attendance: 4,000; Referee: (Switzerland) E. Guidi Bellinzona

11 March 1951 Round 15	Young Boys	3–6	Basel	Wankdorf Stadium, Bern
14:30	Thommen 5' (1:0); Beerli 13' (2:0); Beerli 59' (3:4)	Summary	17' (2:1) Hügi (II); 22' (2:2) Hügi (II); 32' (2:3) Hügi (II); 50' (2:4) Hügi (II); 79' (3:5) Stäuble (3:6) Hügi (II)	Attendance: 8,000; Referee: (Switzerland) Lutz Geneva

18 March 1951 Round 16	Basel	4–2	Servette	Stadion Schützenmatte, Basel
15:00	Wenk 18' (1:1); Stäuble 35' (2:2); Hügi (II) 48' (3:2); Stäuble 75' (4:2)	Summary	17' (0:1) Grobéty; 30' (1:2) Fatton	Attendance: 4,000; Referee: (Switzerland) Dörflinger Grenchen

25 March 1951 Round 12	Chiasso	2–1	Basel	Stadio Via Comacini, Chiasso
	Riva 35' (1:0); Riva 82' (2:1)	Summary	68' (1:1) Stöcklin	Attendance: 3,000; Referee: (Switzerland) von Wartburg Bern

1 April 1951 Round 17	La Chaux-de-Fonds	P–P	Basel	Stade Charrière, La Chaux-de-Fonds
		[ Summary]

8 April 1951 Round 18	Basel	5–1	Zürich	Stadion Schützenmatte, Basel
15:00	Hügi (II) 22' (1:0); Stöcklin 51' (pen. 2:0); Hügi (I) 55' (3:0); Wenk 68' (4:0); Hügi (II) 83' (5:0)	Summary	88' (pen. 4:1) Schneiter	Attendance: 7,000; Referee: (Switzerland) M. Baumberger Lausanne

22 April 1951 Round 19	Lugano	1–0	Basel	Campo Marzio, Lugano
	Bernasconi 24' (1:0)	Summary		Attendance: 2,500; Referee: (Switzerland) Rapin Lausanne

29 April 1951 Round 20	Basel	2–1	Locarno	Stadion Schützenmatte, Basel
15:00	Stöcklin 28' (1:0); Weber 72' (2:0)	Summary	87' (2:1) Ferraris	Attendance: 3,800; Referee: (Switzerland) Paul Wyssling Zürich

5 May 1951 Round 21	Basel	2–3	Cantonal Neuchatel	Stadion Schützenmatte, Basel
15:15	Fitze 76' (1:3); Stöcklin 77' (2:3)	Summary	13' (0:1) Gyger; 63' (0:2) Guillaume; 73' (0:3) Melia	Attendance: 8,000; Referee: (Switzerland) von Gunten Bern

20 May 1951 Round 22	Grenchen	0–1	Basel	Stadion Brühl, Grenchen
		Summary	20' (0:1) Hügi (II)	Attendance: 2,000; Referee: (Switzerland) Bertsche Neuhausen am Rheinfall

27 May 1951 Round 23	Basel	1–4	Lausanne-Sport	Stadion Schützenmatte, Basel
15:00	Hügi (II) 57' (1:2)	Summary	14' (0:1) Maillard (II); 26' (0:3) Maillard (II); 71' (1:3) Friedländer; 88' (1:4) Maillard (II)	Attendance: 4,200; Referee: (Switzerland) E. Guidi Bellinzona

30 May 1951 Round 17	La Chaux-de-Fonds	4–3	Basel	Stade Charrière, La Chaux-de-Fonds
	Antenen 25' (1:2); Sobotka 32' (2:2); Sobotka 48' (3:2); Kernen 58' (4:2)	Summary	3' (0:1) Bannwart; 7' (0:2) Bader; 76' (4:3) Stöcklin	Attendance: 3,100; Referee: (Switzerland) M. Baumberger Lausanne

3 June 1951 Round 24	Young Fellows Zürich	6–2	Basel	Letzigrund, Zürich
15:45	Mauron 28' (1:0); Ballaman 33' (2:0); Fink 55' (3:1); Ballaman 60' (4:1); Mauron 67' (5:1); Siegenthaler 87' (6:2)	Summary	36' (2:1) Wenk; 80' (5:2) Hügi (II)	Attendance: 2,500; Referee: (Switzerland) Rapin Lausanne

10 June 1951 Round 25	Basel	6–2	Chiasso	Stadion Schützenmatte, Basel
15:00	Bader 8' (1:0); Stöcklin 29' (2:1); Stöcklin 55' (3:1); Hügi (II) 57' (4:2); Stöcklin 80' (pen. 5:2); Bader 82' (6:2)	Summary	25' (1:1) Galli; 56' (3:2) Riva; (penalty missed) 77′ Zanollo	Attendance: 5,000; Referee: (Switzerland) Scherz Bern

17 June 1951 Round 26	Bellinzona	2–4	Basel	Stadio Comunale, Bellinzona
	Sartori 5' (1:0); Sartori 16' (2:1)	Summary	10' (pen. 1:1) Stöcklin; 55' (2:2) Hügi (II); 69' (2:3) Hügi (II); 79' (2:4) Hügi (II)	Attendance: 1,000; Referee: (Switzerland) Schmidsberger Zürich

==== League standings ====
Pos	Team	Pld	W	D	L	GF	GA	GD	Pts	Qualification
1	Lausanne-Sport	26	14	6	6	58	31	+27	34	Swiss Champions
2	Chiasso	26	12	7	7	60	52	+8	31	
3	La Chaux-de-Fonds	26	11	8	7	72	64	+8	30	Swiss Cup winners
4	Basel	26	12	4	10	62	51	+11	28	
5	Zürich	26	13	2	11	65	62	+3	28	
6	Servette	26	11	6	9	46	43	+3	28	
7	Young Boys	26	11	5	10	53	55	−2	27	
8	Lugano	26	9	8	9	33	42	−9	26	
9	Bellinzona	26	10	5	11	36	45	−9	25	
10	Young Fellows Zürich	26	9	6	11	55	58	−3	24	
11	Biel-Bienne	26	8	7	11	45	41	+4	23	
12	Locarno	26	8	6	12	40	43	−3	22	Play-off winners, remain in Nationalliga A
13	Grenchen	26	8	6	12	31	47	−16	22	Play-off losers, relegated to Nationalliga B
14	Cantonal Neuchatel	26	4	8	14	41	63	−22	16	Relegated

Source: rsssf.com

=== Swiss Cup ===
29 October 1950 Round 3	FC Münchenstein	0–6	Basel	Sportplatz Heiligholz, Münchenstein
		Summary	15' (0:1) Stäuble; 55' (0:2) Stäuble (0:3) Hügi (II) (0:4) Hügi (II) (0:5) Stäuble (0:6) Wenk	Attendance: 2,300; Referee: (Switzerland) Keller Seuzach

3 December 1950 Round 4	Biel-Bienne	0–1	Basel	Gurzelen Stadion, Biel/Bienne
		Summary	59' (0:1) Stöcklin	Attendance: 3,500; Referee: (Switzerland) Rapin Lausanne

7 January 1951 Round 5	Basel	1–2	Locarno	Stadion Schützenmatte, Basel
14:30	Bader 10' (1:1); Müller (red card) 64'; Wenk (red card) 65'	Summary	2' (0:1) Ernst; 50' (1:2) Ruch	Attendance: 5,300; Referee: (Switzerland) M. Tasca Geneva

== See also ==
- History of FC Basel
- List of FC Basel players
- List of FC Basel seasons

== Sources ==
- Rotblau: Jahrbuch Saison 2014/2015. Publisher: FC Basel Marketing AG. ISBN 978-3-7245-2027-6
- Die ersten 125 Jahre. Publisher: Josef Zindel im Friedrich Reinhardt Verlag, Basel. ISBN 978-3-7245-2305-5
- The FCB team 1950–51 at fcb-archiv.ch
- Switzerland 1950–51 by Erik Garin at Rec.Sport.Soccer Statistics Foundation
