= 1948–49 FC Basel season =

FC Basel
1948–49 season
- Chairman: Jules Düblin
- Manager: Ernst Hufschmid
- Ground: Landhof, Basel
- Nationalliga A: 2nd
- Swiss Cup: Round of 16
- Top goalscorer: League: Hans Hügi (14); All: Hans Hügi (14)
- Highest home attendance: 11,500 on 10 April 1949 vs Lugano
- Lowest home attendance: 3,500 on 6 March 1949 vsYoung Fellows Zürich
- Average home league attendance: 6,846

The 1948–49 season was Fussball Club Basel 1893's 55th season in their existence. It was their third season in the top flight of Swiss football after their promotion from the Nationalliga B during the season 1945–46. Basel played their home games in the Landhof, in the Quarter Kleinbasel. Jules Düblin was the club's chairman for the third successive season.

== Overview ==
Ernst Hufschmid who had functioned as player-coach the previous season continued in the function as manager this season. Basel played a total of 36 games in this season. Of these 26 in the Nationalliga A, four in the Swiss Cup and six were test games. The test games resulted with two victories, three draws and one defeats. In total, including the test games and the cup competition, they won 17 games, drew 11 and lost eight times. In the 36 games they scored 75 goals and conceded 49.

There were fourteen teams contesting in the 1948–49 Nationalliga A, the bottom two teams in the table to be relegated. The team started the season badly, losing three of the first four away games. Things changed in Autumn and they lost only one of the following eleven matches and they climbed to the upper end of the table. At the end of the season Basel had risen to second position, but were seven points behind the new champions Lugano. Basel won 13 of the 26 games and were defeated six times, they scored 58 goals as they gained their 33 points. Hans Hügi was the team's top goal scorer with 14 goals, his brother Josef Hügi (Seppe) scored eight and Gottlieb Stäuble netted nine times.

In the Swiss Cup Basel started in round 3 with an away match against lower tier Winterthur, which was won 2–1. In round 4 Basel were drawn with an away tie against local rivals and lower tier Concordia Basel. In round five Basel were matched against Grasshopper Club with another away game. This was drawn and a replay was required, which was held at the Landhof on 22 January 1949, but ended with a defeat.

== Players ==
The following is the list of the Basel first team squad during the season 1948–49. The list includes players that were in the squad on the day that the Nationalliga A season started on 29 August 1948 but subsequently left the club after that date.

Note: Flags indicate national team as defined under FIFA eligibility rules; some limited exceptions apply. Players may hold more than one non-FIFA nationality.

No.	Pos.	Nation	Player
—	GK	SUI	Walter Müller
—	GK	SUI	Jean Presset
—	DF	SUI	Werner Bopp
—	DF	SUI	Hans-Rudolf Fitze
—	DF	SUI	Hans Hügi
—	DF	SUI	Hans Rieder (I)
—	MF	SUI	Leo Baumgratz
—	MF	SUI	Ernst Hufschmid
—	MF	SUI	Willy Monigatti
—	MF	FRA	Pierre Redolfi

No.	Pos.	Nation	Player
—	MF	SUI	Louis Schenker
—	MF	SUI	Gottlieb Stäuble
—	MF	SUI	Werner Wenk
—	MF	SUI	Willy Zingg
—	FW	SUI	René Bader
—	FW	SUI	Erich Grether
—	FW	SUI	Rudolf Hägler
—	FW	SUI	Josef Hügi
—	FW	SUI	Albert Meier
—	FW	SUI	Paul Stöcklin
—	FW	SUI	Hermann Suter

Players who left the squad

Note: Flags indicate national team as defined under FIFA eligibility rules; some limited exceptions apply. Players may hold more than one non-FIFA nationality.

No.	Pos.	Nation	Player
—	GK	SUI	Hans Rageth
—	DF	SUI	Ernst Grauer (to Grasshopper Club)
—	MF	SUI	Rodolfo Kappenberger (retired)
—	MF	SUI	Kurt Neuenschwander
—	MF	SUI	Traugott Oberer (to Cantonal Neuchatel)
—	MF	SUI	Hans Vonthron (retired)
—	MF	SUI	Rudolf Wirz (retired)

No.	Pos.	Nation	Player
—	FW	SUI	Walter Bosshard (to Vevey Sports)
—	FW	FRA	Walter Emmenegger
—	FW	SUI	Roberto Finazzi
—	FW	SUI	Ch. Martin
—	FW	SUI	Alex Mathys (to Concordia Basel)
—	FW	SUI	Virgilio Muggiasca
—	FW	SUI	Bernard Mathez (to Cantonal Neuchatel)
—	FW	SUI	Alfred Weisshaar

== Results ==
=== Legend ===
Win Draw Loss Postponed

=== Friendly matches ===
==== Pre and mid-season ====
8 August 1948 Pre-season	Mulhouse (France)	2–2	(Switzerland) Basel	Mulhouse
	Goal	Summary	(1x) Hügi (I) (1x) Stäuble

14 August 1948 Pre-season	Basel (Switzerland)	3–3	(France) Sochaux-Montbéliard	Landhof, Basel
	Bader 35' (1:0); Bader (2:2); Hügi (I) (3:2)	Summary	(1:1) Tichy (1:2) Humpál (3:3) Campiglia	Attendance: 4,000; Referee: (Switzerland) von Wartburg Bern

22 August 1948 Pre-season	Grasshopper Club (Switzerland)	1–1	(Switzerland) Basel	Stadion FC Solothurn, Solothurn
	Quinche 44' (1:0)	Summary	(1:1) Hügi (II)	Attendance: 3,000; Referee: (Switzerland) Stuber Solothurn

10 October 1948 Mid-season	Karlsruher SV (Germany)	1–0	(Switzerland) Basel	KSV-Platz, Karlsruhe
	Bechtel 30' (1:0)	Summary		Attendance: 20,000; Referee: (Germany) Adolf Reinhardt Stuttgart

=== Nationalliga ===
==== League matches ====
29 August 1948 Round 1	Biel-Bienne	2–1	Basel	Gurzelen Stadion, Biel/Bienne
	Wiedmer 53' (1:0); Ballaman (2:0)	Summary	87' (2:1) Hügi (I)	Attendance: 5,000; Referee: (Switzerland) Schürch Winterthur

5 September 1948 Round 2	Basel	3–2	La Chaux-de-Fonds	Landhof, Basel
	Hügi (II) 3' (1:0); Hügi (II) 26' (2:0); Hügi (I) 57' (3:0)	Summary	59' (pen. 3:1) Amey; 55' (3:2) Antenen	Attendance: 8,000; Referee: (Switzerland) Stuber Solothurn

12 September 1948 Round 3	Young Fellows Zürich	3–3	Basel	Hardturm, Zürich
	Mauron 20' (1:1); Siegenthaler 45' (2:1); Siegenthaler 50' (3:1)	Summary	11' (0:1) Stöcklin; 67' (3:2) Wenk; 88' (3:3) Grether	Attendance: 7,000; Referee: (Switzerland) Merlotti NeuchâtelD

26 September 1948 Round 4	Lausanne-Sport	2–0	Basel	Olympique de la Pontaise, Lausanne
15:30	Maillard (II) 44' (1:0); Maillard (II) 70' (2:0)	Summary		Attendance: 8,000; Referee: (Switzerland) von Wartburg Bern

3 October 1948 Round 5	Basel	3–0	Servette	Landhof, Basel
	Hügi (I) 38' (1:0); Stöcklin 51' (2:0); Hügi (I) 89' (3:0)	Summary		Attendance: 6,000; Referee: (Switzerland) von Gunten Bern

17 October 1948 Round 6	Lugano	1–0	Basel	Campo Marzio, Lugano
	Bottinelli 40' (pen. 1:0)	Summary		Attendance: 2,500; Referee: (Switzerland) Niederhauser Bern

24 October 1948 Round 7	Basel	4–1	Locarno	Landhof, Basel
	Stäuble 30' (1:1); Grether 50' (2:1); Hügi (I) 53' (3:1); Stöcklin 87' (4:1)	Summary	20' (0:1) Giulietti	Attendance: 6,000; Referee: (Switzerland) A. Sandoz Lausanne

31 October 1948 Round 8	Grenchen	2–3	Basel	Stadion Brühl, Grenchen
	Righetti (II) 19' (1:0); Righetti (II) 20' (2:2)	Summary	31' (1:1) Hügi (I); 36' (1:2) Stäuble; 65' (2:3) Bader; (red card) 85' Stäuble	Attendance: 3,000; Referee: (Switzerland) Scherz Bern

6 November 1948 Round 9	Basel	3–1	Zürich	Landhof, Basel
	Wenk 19' (1:0); Stäuble 28' (2:1); Bopp 79 pen. 3:1'	Summary	23' (pen. 1:1) Andres	Attendance: 6,000; Referee: (Switzerland) M. Tasca Geneva

21 November 1948 Round 10	Grasshopper Club	2–2	Basel	Hardturm, Zürich
14:45	Amadò 26' (1:0); Scholl 41' (2:0)	Summary	72' (pen. 2:1) Bopp; Monigatti	Attendance: 10,000; Referee: (Switzerland) Niederhauser Bern

27 November 1948 Round 11	Basel	1–1	Urania Genève Sport	Landhof, Basel
	Hügi (II) 35' (1:1)	Summary	13' (0:1) Delabays	Attendance: 5,000; Referee: (Switzerland) Merlotti Neuchâtel

12 December 1948 Round 12	Chiasso	2–1	Basel	Stadio Via Comacini, Chiasso
	Albizzati 67' (1:1); Bianchi 87' (2:1)	Summary	62' (0:1) Bader	Attendance: 2,000; Referee: (Switzerland) Schürch Winterthur

19 December 1948 Round 13	Basel	1–0	Bellinzona	Landhof, Basel
	Wenk 35' (1:0)	Summary		Attendance: 7,000; Referee: (Switzerland) Studer Solothurn

20 February 1949 Round 14	Basel	1–1	Biel-Bienne	Landhof, Basel
15:00	Wenk 56' (1:1)	Summary	39' (0:1) Ballaman	Attendance: 6,200; Referee: (Switzerland) Schürch Winterthur

27 February 1949 Round 15	La Chaux-de-Fonds	P – P	Basel	Stade Charrière, La Chaux-de-Fonds
		[ Summary]

6 March 1949 Round 16	Basel	6–1	Young Fellows Zürich	Landhof, Basel
	Hügi (II) 18' (1:1); Hügi (II) 30' (2:1); Bopp 41' (pen. 3:1); Stöcklin 46' (4:1); Stöcklin 60' (5:1); Hügi (II) 69' (6:1)	Summary	3' (0:1) Bossert	Attendance: 3,500; Referee: (Switzerland) Lutz Geneva

13 March 1949 Round 25	Basel	4–0	Chiasso	Landhof, Basel
	Bader 44' (1:0); Bopp 70' (pen. 2:0); Bopp 72' (pen. 3:0); Stäuble 80' (4:0)	Summary		Attendance: 6,800; Referee: (Switzerland) E. Ruefer Bern

20 March 1949 Round 17	Basel	3–1	Lausanne-Sport	Landhof, Basel
	Bopp (penalty missed) 34′ Hügi (I) 56' (1:1); Bader 62' (2:1); Hügi (II) 86' (3:1)	Summary	11' (pen. 0:1) Nikolić	Attendance: 9,000; Referee: (Switzerland) Keller Seuzach

April 1949 Round 18	Servette	P – P	Basel	Charmilles Stadium, Geneva
		[ Summary]

10 April 1949 Round 19	Basel	0–1	Lugano	Landhof, Basel
15:00		Summary	(penalty missed) 20′ Hasler; 83' (0:1) Bernasconi	Attendance: 11,500; Referee: (Switzerland) Lutz Geneva

24 April 1949 Round 20	Locarno	2–0	Basel	Stadio del Lido, Locarno
	Ciseri 59' (1:0); Canetti 86' (2:0)	Summary		Attendance: 2,500; Referee: (Switzerland) Lutz Geneva

8 May 1949 Round 22	Zürich	2–4	Basel	Hardturm, Zürich
	Andres 25' (1:1); Litscher (yellow card) 62'; Haug 67' (2:4)	Summary	8' (0:1) Hügi (I); 28' (1:2) Hügi (I); 44' (1:3) Hügi (II); 62' (pen. 1:4) Schenker	Attendance: 9,000; Referee: (Switzerland) M. Tasca Geneva

11 May 1949 Round 21	Basel	2–2	Grenchen	Landhof, Basel
18:15	Schenker (penalty missed); Hügi (I) 30' (1:2); Tanner 43' (o.g. 2:2)	Summary	15' (0:1) Righetti (I); 26' (0:2) Righetti (II)	Attendance: 5,000; Referee: (Switzerland) E. Ruefer Bern

15 May 1949 Round 23	Basel	2–0	Grasshopper Club	Landhof, Basel
16:00	Stäuble 30' (1:0); Hügi (I) 73' (2:0)	Summary		Attendance: 9,000; Referee: (Switzerland) Niederhauser Bern

21 May 1949 Round 24	Urania Genève Sport	2–3	Basel	Stade de Frontenex, Geneva
	Patane 7' (1:0); Tschan 24' (2:1)	Summary	21' (1:1) Hügi (I); 60' (2:2) Bader; 78' (2:3) Stäuble	Attendance: 3,500; Referee: (Switzerland) Schürch Winterthur

29 May 1949 Round 15	La Chaux-de-Fonds	2–4	Basel	Stade Charrière, La Chaux-de-Fonds
15:00	Baumgratz 20' (o.g. 1:0); Amey (2:2)	Summary	22' (1:1) Baumgratz (1:2) Stäuble (2:3) Stäuble (2:4) Stäuble; (yellow card) Hügi (II)	Attendance: 4,000; Referee: (Switzerland) Rapin Lausanne

11 June 1949 Round 26	Bellinzona	3–3	Basel	Stadio Comunale, Bellinzona
	Caccia 3' (1:0); Sormani 7' (2:0); Lusenti 28' (3:0)	Summary	30' (pen. 3:1) Stöcklin; 75' (3:2) Hügi (I); 77' (3:3) Hügi (I)	Attendance: 1,200; Referee: (Switzerland) Tschopp Delémont

17 June 1949 Round 18	Servette	1–1	Basel	Charmilles Stadium, Geneva
	Fatton 70' (pen. 1:1); Tamini (yellow card) 80'	Summary	21' (0:1) Stöcklin; (yellow card) 71' (yellow-red card) 71' Schenker	Attendance: 5,500; Referee: (Switzerland) Lottenbach Langenthal

==== League standings ====
Pos	Team	Pld	W	D	L	GF	GA	GD	Pts	Qualification
1	Lugano	26	18	4	4	41	18	+23	40	Swiss Champions
2	Basel	26	13	7	6	58	37	+21	33	
3	La Chaux-de-Fonds	26	11	7	8	54	50	+4	29	
4	Servette	26	10	7	9	59	43	+16	27	Swiss Cup winners
5	Zürich	26	10	7	9	65	59	+6	27	
6	Bellinzona	26	9	9	8	31	33	−2	27	
7	Locarno	26	10	7	9	32	40	−8	27	
8	Lausanne-Sport	26	11	4	11	52	41	+11	26	
9	Biel-Bienne	26	10	5	11	39	38	+1	25	
10	Grenchen	26	6	11	9	39	42	−3	23	
11	Chiasso	26	8	6	12	35	55	−20	22	
12	Young Fellows Zürich	26	8	5	13	45	66	−21	21	
13	Grasshopper Club	26	7	6	13	42	51	−9	20	Relegated
14	Urania Genève Sport	26	4	9	13	32	51	−19	17	Relegated

Source: rsssf.com

=== Swiss Cup ===
14 November 1948 Round 3	Winterthur	1–2	Basel	Schützenwiese, Winterthur
	Diggelmann 35' (1:1)	Summary	23' (0:1) Bader; 88' (1:2) Fitze	Attendance: 4,500; Referee: (Switzerland) Beck Zürich

26 December 1948 Round 4	Concordia Basel	0–1	Basel	Landhof, Basel
	(penalty missed) 90′	Summary	19' (0:1) Baumgratz	Attendance: 2,700; Referee: (Switzerland) E. Ruefer Bern

9 January 1949 Round of 16	Grasshopper Club	1–1 (a.e.t.)	Basel	Hardturm, Zürich
14:15	Berbig 59' (1:0)	Summary	75' (1:1) Stäuble	Attendance: 3,000; Referee: (Switzerland) A. Sandoz Lausanne

22 January 1949 Round of 16 replay	Basel	1–2	Grasshopper Club	Landhof, Basel
	Bopp 33' (pen. 1:0)	Summary	64' (1:1) Wang; 75' (1:2) Scholl	Attendance: 6,500; Referee: (Switzerland) von Wartburg Bern

== See also ==
- History of FC Basel
- List of FC Basel players
- List of FC Basel seasons

== Sources ==
- Rotblau: Jahrbuch Saison 2014/2015. Publisher: FC Basel Marketing AG. ISBN 978-3-7245-2027-6
- Die ersten 125 Jahre. Publisher: Josef Zindel im Friedrich Reinhardt Verlag, Basel. ISBN 978-3-7245-2305-5
- The FCB team 1948–49 at fcb-archiv.ch
- Switzerland 1948–49 by Erik Garin at Rec.Sport.Soccer Statistics Foundation
