= 1949–50 FC Basel season =

FC Basel
1949–50 season
- Chairman: Jules Düblin
- Manager: Ernst Hufschmid
- Ground: Landhof, Basel
- Nationalliga A: 2nd
- Swiss Cup: Semi-final
- Top goalscorer: League: Gottlieb Stäuble (13); All: Gottlieb Stäuble (15)
- Highest home attendance: 14,000 on 21 May 1950 vs Lausanne-Sport
- Lowest home attendance: 4,400 on 10 September 1949 vs Young Fellows Zürich
- Average home league attendance: 6,753

The 1949–50 season was Fussball Club Basel 1893's 56th season in their existence. It was their fourth season in the top flight of Swiss football following their promotion from the Nationalliga B after the season 1945–46. This season Basel played their home games in the Stadion Schützenmatte in the Bachletten quartier in the southwestern edge of the city of Basel. Jules Düblin was the club's chairman for the fourth successive season.

== Overview ==
Ernst Hufschmid, who had functioned as player-coach the previous two seasons, continued in this function this season. Basel played a total of 41 games in this season. Of these 26 in the Nationalliga A, five in the Swiss Cup and ten were test games. The test games resulted with three victories and seven defeats. In total, including the test games and the cup competition, they won 21 games, drew five and lost 15 times. In the 41 games they scored 78 goals and conceded 75.

There were fourteen teams contesting in the 1949–50 Nationalliga A, the bottom two teams in the table to be relegated. Basel started the season well, winning six of the first seven games and things continued well. Basel stayed in contention of the championship. But at the end of the season they lost their last two games and finished in second position, two points behind the new champions Servette who won their last two games. Basel won 14 games, drew five and were defeated seven times, they scored 48 goals as they gained their 33 points. Gottlieb Stäuble with 13 goals was the team's best scorer and 8th best league scorer. René Bader was the team's second best goal getter, netting nine times, Paul Stöcklin netted six times.

Basel started in the 3rd round of the Swiss Cup with an away match against lower tier FC Porrentruy. This was won. In round 4 Basel were drawn away against Grasshopper Club and this too was won. In the round of 16 and the quarter-final Basel played at home and won against Wil and Bellinzona respectively. However Lausanne-Sport won the semi-final and continued to the final and they won the trophy.

== Players ==
The following is the list of the Basel first team squad during the season 1949–50. The list includes players that were in the squad on the day that the Nationalliga A season started on 28 August 1949 but subsequently left the club after that date.

Note: Flags indicate national team as defined under FIFA eligibility rules; some limited exceptions apply. Players may hold more than one non-FIFA nationality.

No.	Pos.	Nation	Player
—	GK	SUI	Walter Müller
—	GK	SUI	Jean Presset
—	DF	SUI	Werner Bopp
—	DF	SUI	Hans-Rudolf Fitze
—	DF	SUI	Ernst Hufschmid (Player-coach)
—	DF	SUI	Hans Hügi
—	MF	SUI	Leo Baumgratz
—	MF	SUI	Otto Krieg
—	MF	FRA	Pierre Redolfi
—	MF	SUI	Louis Schenker

No.	Pos.	Nation	Player
—	MF	SUI	Gottlieb Stäuble
—	MF	SUI	Werner Wenk
—	MF	SUI	Willy Zingg
—	FW	SUI	René Bader
—	FW	SUI	Walter Bannwart
—	FW	SUI	Erich Grether
—	FW	FRA	René Hebinger
—	FW	SUI	Josef Hügi
—	FW	SUI	Albert Meier
—	FW	SUI	Otto Soltermann
—	FW	SUI	Paul Stöcklin

Players who left the squad

Note: Flags indicate national team as defined under FIFA eligibility rules; some limited exceptions apply. Players may hold more than one non-FIFA nationality.

No.	Pos.	Nation	Player
—	DF	SUI	Hans Rieder (I) (to Nordstern Basel)
—	MF	SUI	Willy Monigatti

No.	Pos.	Nation	Player
—	FW	SUI	Rudolf Hägler (to Nordstern Basel)
—	FW	SUI	Hermann Suter (to Young Fellows Zürich)

== Results ==
=== Legend ===
Win Draw Loss Postponed

=== Friendly matches ===
==== Pre-season ====
7 August 1949 Pre-season	Fortuna Freiburg (Germany)	4–2	(Switzerland) Basel	Freiburg
	Sloal 40' (1:0); Dudeck 60' (2:1); Liechty (3:2); Liechty 78' (4:2)	Summary	50' (o.g. 1:1) (2:2)	Referee: (Germany) Link Freiburg

13 August 1949 Pre-season	Basel (Switzerland)	4–1	(Germany) Bayern Munich	Stadion Schützenmatte, Basel
17:00	Hügi (I) 17' (1:0); Hügi (I) 18' (2:0); Bader 25' (3:0); Stöcklin 35' (4:0); Stöcklin (penalty missed) ′	Summary	60' (4:1) Metz	Attendance: 3,800; Referee: (Switzerland) Berner Basel

21 August 1949 Pre-season	Eintracht Frankfurt (Germany)	4–1	(Switzerland) Basel	Waldstadion, Frankfurt
	Schieth 11' (1:0); Schieth 38' (2:0); Schieth 51' (3:0); Schieth 55' (4:0)	Summary	67' (4:1) Bader	Attendance: 30,000; Referee: (Switzerland) Schmidt Frankfurt

==== Mid- to end of season ====
2 October 1949 Mid-season	Basel (Switzerland)	1–2	(Germany) Borussia Neunkirchen	Stadion Schützenmatte, Basel
15:00	Bopp 17' (pen. 1:0)	Summary	31' (1:1) Siedl; 83' (1:2) Schirra	Attendance: 1,400; Referee: (Switzerland) Hans Vogt Schweizerhalle, Muttenz

19 February 1950 Mid-season	Basel (Switzerland)	3–2	(Switzerland) Nordstern Basel	Stadion Schützenmatte, Basel
15:00	Bader 7' (1:0); Stöcklin 43' (pen. 2:0); Wenk 88' (3:2)	Summary	49' (2:1) Willimann; 76' (2:2) Kirchhofer	Attendance: 2,200; Referee: (Switzerland) Reimann Rheinfelden

14 March 1950 Mid-season	Cantonal Neuchatel (Switzerland)	6–1	(Switzerland) Basel	Stade de la Maladière (1924), Neuchâtel
	Monnard (2x); Buchoux (1x); Facchinetti (1x); Oberer (1x); Mella (1x)	Summary	(o.g.) Gyger	Attendance: 3,800; Referee: (Switzerland) von Wartburg Bern

10 April 1950 Tournament	Aarhus GF (Denmark)	2–1	(Switzerland) Basel	Liège
	Goal	Summary	(1x) Stäuble

10 April 1950 Tournament	LASK (Austria)	2–1	(Switzerland) Basel	Liège
	Goal	Summary	(1x) Hebinger

13 June 1950 End of season	Basel (Switzerland)	1–3	(Italy) Inter Milan	Stadion Schützenmatte, Basel
18:45	Wenk 32' (1:0)	Summary	40' (pen. 1:1) Nyers; 63' (1:2) Borri; 77' (1:3) Wilkes	Attendance: 3,500; Referee: (Switzerland) Paul Wyssling Zürich

21 June 1950 End of season	Basel (Switzerland)	4–3	(Socialist Federal Republic of Yugoslavia) Hajduk Split	Stadion Schützenmatte, Basel
18:45	Hügi (II) 21' (1:2); Hügi (II) 59' (2:2); Stäuble 75' (3:2); Bannwart 80' (4:2)	Summary	4' (0:1) Arapović; 7' (0:2) Luštica; 87' (4:3) Vidjak	Attendance: 2,100; Referee: (Switzerland) Dörflinger Grenchen

=== Nationalliga ===
==== League matches ====
28 August 1949 Round 1	Basel	4–2	Servette	Stadion Schützenmatte, Basel
16:00	Bader 5' (1:0); Stäuble 30' (2:0); Stäuble 67' (3:2); Bader 75' (4:2)	Summary	49' (2:1) Fatton; 62' (2:2) Belli	Attendance: 6,000; Referee: (Switzerland) DörflingerGrenchen

4 September 1949 Round 2	Biel-Bienne	0–0	Basel	Gurzelen Stadion, Biel/Bienne
15:00		Summary		Attendance: 4,000; Referee: (Switzerland) Niederhauser Bern

10 September 1949 Round 3	Basel	3–0	Young Fellows Zürich	Stadion Schützenmatte, Basel
16:30	Hügi (II) 43' (1:0); Hügi (I) 62' (2:0); Bader 82' (3:0)	Summary		Attendance: 4,400; Referee: (Switzerland) M. Tasca Geneva

24 September 1949 Round 4	La Chaux-de-Fonds	0–2	Basel	Stade Charrière, La Chaux-de-Fonds
16:30		Summary	17' (0:1) Bader; 77' (0:2) Bader	Attendance: 3,500; Referee: (Switzerland) von Gunten Bern

9 October 1949 Round 5	Basel	3–0	Locarno	Stadion Schützenmatte, Basel
15:00	Bopp 53' (pen. 1:0); Wenk 60' (2:0); Bader 65' (3:0)	Summary		Attendance: 5,400; Referee: (Switzerland) E. Ruefer Bern

16 October 1949 Round 6	Lugano	1–2	Basel	Campo Marzio, Lugano
15:00	S. Bernasconi 75' (1:2)	Summary	16' (0:1) Stäuble; 71' (0:2) Wenk	Attendance: 4,500; Referee: (Switzerland) Lutz Geneva

12 October 1949 Round 7	Basel	2–0	St. Gallen	Stadion Schützenmatte, Basel
15:00	Stöcklin 69' (1:0); Hügi (I) 72' (2:0)	Summary		Attendance: 6,800; Referee: (Switzerland) Scherz Bern

6 November 1949 Round 8	Basel	1–1	Grenchen	Stadion Schützenmatte, Basel
14:45	Hügi (II) 63' (1:1)	Summary	65' (0:1) Righetti (I)	Attendance: 6,500; Referee: (Switzerland) M. Tasca Geneva

13 November 1949 Round 9	Zürich	5–2	Basel	Letzigrund, Zürich
14:45	Zanetti 10' (1:0); Bosshard 25' (2:0); Hotz 52' (3:0); Zanetti 66' (4:0); Zanetti 86' (5:1)	Summary	40' (1:1) Stäuble; 87' (5:2) Krieg	Attendance: 14,000; Referee: (Switzerland) Tschopp Delémont

20 November 1949 Round 10	Basel	3–1	FC Bern	Stadion Schützenmatte, Basel
14:45	Bannwart 12' (1:0); Bader 15' (2:0); Bannwart 42' (3:0)	Summary	85' (3:1) Liechti	Attendance: 6,400; Referee: (Switzerland) Keller Seuzach

4 December 1949 Round 11	Lausanne-Sport	2–2	Basel	Olympique de la Pontaise, Lausanne
14:30	Nikolić 75' (1:2); Nikolić 80' (2:2)	Summary	6' (0:1) Stäuble; 52' (0:2) Hügi (I)	Attendance: 12,000; Referee: (Switzerland) W. Rufli Bremgarten

11 December 1949 Round 12	Basel	1–0	Bellinzona	Stadion Schützenmatte, Basel
14:30	Stäuble 27' (pen. 1:0)	Summary		Attendance: 7,300; Referee: (Switzerland) Zutter Bern

18 December 1949 Round 13	Chiasso	2–1	Basel	Stadio Via Comacini, Chiasso
14:30	Zanollo 44' (1:1); Bühler 47' (2:1)	Summary	13' (o.g. 0:1) Noseda	Attendance: 3,000; Referee: (Switzerland) Merlotti Neuchâtel

15 January 1950 Round 14	Servette	2–0	Basel	Charmilles Stadium, Geneva
14:45	Fatton 6' (1:0); Fatton 80' (2:0)	Summary		Attendance: 12,000; Referee: (Switzerland) Scherz Bern

26 February 1950 Round 15	Basel	1–1	Biel-Bienne	Stadion Schützenmatte, Basel
16:00	Stäuble 41' (1:0)	Summary	58' (1:1)	Attendance: 2,100; Referee: (Switzerland) Schürch Winterthur

12 March 1950 Round 16	Young Fellows Zürich	1–2	Basel	Hardturm, Zürich
14:45	Busenhart 21' (pen. 1:1)	Summary	20' (pen. 0:1) Stöcklin; 58' (1:2) Stöcklin	Attendance: 6,000; Referee: (Switzerland) Scherz Bern

26 March 1950 Round 17	Basel	4–3	La Chaux-de-Fonds	Stadion Schützenmatte, Basel
15:00	Bader 44' (1:1); Soltermann 51' (2:1); Stöcklin 53' (3:1); Wenk 55' (4:1)	Summary	40' (0:1) Sobotka; 60' (4:2) Chodat; 61' (4:3) Antenen	Attendance: 6,800; Referee: (Switzerland) Niederhauser Bern

2 April 1950 Round 18	Locarno	5–0	Basel	Stadio del Lido, Locarno
14:30	Ernst 15' (1:0); Canetti 34' (2:0); Fuesetti 44' (3:0); Canetti 70' (4:0); Fuesetti 89' (5:0)	Summary		Attendance: 2,800; Referee: (Switzerland) Rapin Lausanne

16 April 1950 Round 19	Basel	3–2	Lugano	Stadion Schützenmatte, Basel
15:00	Stäuble 41' (1:1); Stäuble 58' (2:1); Hügi (II) 75' (3:2)	Summary	38' (0:1) Kauer; 61' (2:2) Hasler	Attendance: 7,600; Referee: (Switzerland) Merlotti Neuchâtel

23 April 1950 Round 20	St. Gallen	3–0	Basel	Espenmoos, St. Gallen
14:30	Bertsch 24' (1:0); Bertsch 31' (2:0); Dorninger 80' (3:0)	Summary	(penalty missed) 68′ Wenk	Attendance: 3,500; Referee: (Switzerland) Schmidsberger Zürich

30 April 1950 Round 21	Grenchen	2–2	Basel	Stadion Brühl, Grenchen
	Hebinger 49' (o.g. 1:1); Courtat (penalty missed) 55′ Vuilleumier 70' (2:2)	Summary	23' (0:1) Stöcklin; 53' (1:2) Stäuble	Attendance: 4,000; Referee: (Switzerland) M. Tasca Geneva

7 May 1950 Round 22	Basel	3–2	Zürich	Stadion Schützenmatte, Basel
15:00	Stäuble 13' (1:1); Bannwart 30' (2:1); Bannwart 66' (3:2)	Summary	9' (0:1) Andres; 55' (2:2) Andres	Attendance: 8,500; Referee: (Switzerland) von Gunten Bern

14 May 1950 Round 23	FC Bern	0–4	Basel	Neufeld, Bern
15:00		Summary	35' (0:1) Bader; 46' (0:2) Stäuble; 75' (0:3) Hügi (II); 80' (0:4) Stäuble	Attendance: 3,000; Referee: (Switzerland) Dörflinger Grenchen

21 May 1950 Round 24	Basel	2–1	Lausanne-Sport	Stadion Schützenmatte, Basel
15:00	Bannwart 2' (1:0); Stäuble 65' (2:1)	Summary	51' (1:1) Friedländer	Attendance: 14,000; Referee: (Switzerland) Scherz Bern

28 May 1950 Round 25	Bellinzona	2–1	Basel	Stadio Comunale, Bellinzona
15:00	Lusenti 17' (pen. 1:0); Lusenti 69' (2:1)	Summary	(penalty missed) 40′ Bader; 55' (1:1) Grether	Attendance: 2,000; Referee: (Switzerland) Rapin Lausanne

4 June 1950 Round 26	Basel	0–2	Chiasso	Stadion Schützenmatte, Basel
15:00		Summary	13' (0:1) Galli; 86' (0:2) Bühler	Attendance: 6,000; Referee: (Switzerland) von Wartburg Bern

==== League standings ====
Pos	Team	Pld	W	D	L	GF	GA	GD	Pts	Qualification
1	Servette	26	16	3	7	73	41	+32	35	Swiss Champions
2	Basel	26	14	5	7	48	40	+8	33	
3	Lausanne-Sport	26	12	8	6	57	35	+22	32	Swiss Cup winners
4	Chiasso	26	13	5	8	45	39	+6	31	
5	La Chaux-de-Fonds	26	12	7	7	56	53	+3	31	
6	Zürich	26	12	4	10	59	46	+13	28	
7	Grenchen	26	10	7	9	43	44	−1	27	
8	Bellinzona	26	11	4	11	43	44	−1	26	
9	Lugano	26	9	6	11	47	45	+2	24	
10	Young Fellows Zürich	26	10	4	12	48	50	−2	24	
11	Locarno	26	10	4	12	40	47	−7	24	
12	Biel-Bienne	26	8	6	12	45	42	+3	22	
13	St. Gallen	26	7	2	17	40	79	−39	16	Relegated
14	FC Bern	26	4	3	19	31	70	−39	11	Relegated

Source: rsssf.com

=== Swiss Cup ===
30 October 1949 Round 3	FC Porrentruy	1–2	Basel	Stade du Tirage, Porrentruy
	N. Adam 86' (1:2)	Summary	37' (0:1) Hügi (I); 79' (0:2) Stäuble	Attendance: 3,200; Referee: (Switzerland) von Wartburg Bern

27 November 1949 Round 4	Grasshopper Club	1–2	Basel	Hardturm, Zürich
12:30	Bickel 2' (1:0)	Summary	5' (1:1) Bader; 50' (1:2) Hügi (I)	Attendance: 16,000; Referee: (Switzerland) M. Tasca Geneva

1 January 1950 Round of 16	Basel	5–2	Wil	Stadion Rankhof, Basel
14:30	Wenk 3' (1:0); Hügi (I) 47' (2:0); Bannwart 50' (3:0); Stäuble 76' (4:1); Krieg 78' (5:1)	Summary	62' (pen. 3:1) Conte (I); 90' (4:2) Hagen (II)	Attendance: 6,500; Referee: (Switzerland) Scherz Bern

5 February 1950 Quarter-final	Basel	2–0	Bellinzona	Stadion Schützenmatte, Basel
15:00	Bader 30' (1:0); Stöcklin 67' (pen. 2:0); Hügi (II) (red card)	Summary		Attendance: 8,700; Referee: (Switzerland) M. Tasca Geneva

5 March 1950 Semi-final	Basel	0–1	Lausanne-Sport	Stadion Schützenmatte, Basel
15:30		Summary	85' (0:1) Maillard (II)	Attendance: 12,500; Referee: (Switzerland) E. Ruefer Bern

== See also ==
- History of FC Basel
- List of FC Basel players
- List of FC Basel seasons

== Sources ==
- Rotblau: Jahrbuch Saison 2014/2015. Publisher: FC Basel Marketing AG. ISBN 978-3-7245-2027-6
- Die ersten 125 Jahre. Publisher: Josef Zindel im Friedrich Reinhardt Verlag, Basel. ISBN 978-3-7245-2305-5
- The FCB team 1949–50 at fcb-archiv.ch
- Switzerland 1949–50 by Erik Garin at Rec.Sport.Soccer Statistics Foundation
