= 1947–48 FC Basel season =

FC Basel
1947–48 season
- Chairman: Jules Düblin
- Manager: Ernst Hufschmid
- Ground: Landhof, Basel
- Nationalliga A: 10th
- Swiss Cup: Quarter-final
- Top goalscorer: League: Paul Stöcklin (11); All: Traugott Oberer and Paul Stöcklin both (11)
- Highest home attendance: 8,700 on 25 April 1948 vs Biel-Bienne
- Lowest home attendance: 3,500 on 21 December 1947 vs Grenchen
- Average home league attendance: 6,807

The 1947–48 season was Fussball Club Basel 1893's 54th season in their existence. It was their second season in the top flight of Swiss football after their promotion from the Nationalliga B during the season 1945–46. Basel played their home games in the Landhof, in the Quarter Kleinbasel. Jules Düblin was the club's chairman for the second successive season.

== Overview ==
Anton Schall was to continue as first team manager, but he died at the age of 40 years, during a workout on the football field, shortly after the pre-season training had begun. Following this unhappy event captain Ernst Hufschmid then took over as player-manager. Basel played a total of 46 games in this season. Of these 26 in the Nationalliga A, four in the Swiss Cup and 16 were test games. The test games resulted with eight victories, three draws and five defeats. In total, they won 18 games, drew 13 and lost 15 times. In total, including the test games and the cup competition, they scored 100 goals and conceded 93.

There were fourteen teams contesting in the 1947–48 Nationalliga A, the bottom two teams in the table to be relegated. Suffering under the shock of team manager Schall's death, the team started the season badly, losing six of their first eleven games without a single victory. With seven victories in the second half of the season the team were able to lift themselves out of the relegation zone. Basel finished the season in 10th position in the table, with seven victories from 26 games, ten draws and they lost nine times. The team scored 44 goals in the domestic league. Paul Stöcklin was the team's top goal scorer with 11 goals. Gottlieb Stäuble was second best scorer with eight goals. René Bader and Traugott Oberer both scored five times. Bellinzona won the championship. FC Bern and Cantonal Neuchatel ended the season on the relegation places.

In the Swiss Cup Basel started in round 3 with a home match against SC Balerna, the game was won 7–0. In round 4 Basel were drawn with a home tie against Zürich which was won 2–1. Round 5 gave Basel another home tie in the Landhof against Locarno and this ended with a 5–3 victory. Thus Basel advanced to the quarter-finals, where they were drawn away against La Chaux-de-Fonds. The hosts won the game by two goals to nil and continued to the semi-final and the final. The final was played on 29 March at Wankdorf Stadium in Bern against Grenchen and ended with a 2–2 draw. The replay three weeks later was also drawn 2–2 and so a second replay was required. This was played on 27 June in the Stade Olympique de la Pontaise in Lausanne. La Chaux-de-Fonds won the trophy, winning the game by four goals to nil.

== Players ==
The following is the list of the Basel first team squad during the season 1947–48. The list includes players that were in the squad the day the Nationalliga A season started on 31 August 1947 but subsequently left the club after that date.

Note: Flags indicate national team as defined under FIFA eligibility rules; some limited exceptions apply. Players may hold more than one non-FIFA nationality.

No.	Pos.	Nation	Player
—	GK	SUI	Walter Müller
—	GK	SUI	Jean Presset
—	GK	SUI	Hans Rageth
—	DF	SUI	Werner Bopp
—	DF	SUI	Hans-Rudolf Fitze
—	DF	SUI	Ernst Grauer
—	DF	SUI	Ernst Hufschmid
—	DF	SUI	Hans Hügi
—	MF	SUI	Rodolfo Kappenberger
—	MF	SUI	Willy Monigatti
—	MF	SUI	Kurt Neuenschwander
—	MF	SUI	Traugott Oberer
—	MF	FRA	Pierre Redolfi
—	MF	SUI	Louis Schenker
—	MF	SUI	Gottlieb Stäuble

No.	Pos.	Nation	Player
—	MF	SUI	Hans Vonthron
—	MF	SUI	Werner Wenk
—	MF	SUI	Rudolf Wirz
—	FW	SUI	René Bader
—	FW	SUI	Walter Bosshard
—	FW	FRA	Walter Emmenegger
—	FW	SUI	Roberto Finazzi
—	FW	SUI	Erich Grether
—	FW	SUI	Rudolf Hägler
—	FW	SUI	Ch. Martin
—	FW	SUI	Alex Mathys
—	FW	SUI	Virgilio Muggiasca
—	FW	SUI	Bernard Mathez
—	FW	SUI	Paul Stöcklin
—	FW	SUI	Hermann Suter
—	FW	SUI	Alfred Weisshaar

Players who left the squad

Note: Flags indicate national team as defined under FIFA eligibility rules; some limited exceptions apply. Players may hold more than one non-FIFA nationality.

No.	Pos.	Nation	Player
—	GK	SUI	Kurt Imhof (retired)
—	GK	SUI	Hans Rothen
—	MF	SUI	Alexander Ebner (to Cantonal Neuchatel)

No.	Pos.	Nation	Player
—	MF	SUI	Heinz Elsässer (retired)
—	MF	SUI	Kurt Maurer (to FC Bern)
—	FW	SUI	Fritz Eckert

== Results ==
=== Legend ===
Win Draw Loss Postponed

=== Friendly matches ===
==== Pre and mid-season ====
9 August 1947 Pre-season	Black Stars (Switzerland)	2–2	(Switzerland) Basel	Buschwilerhof, Basel
	Eckert (1:0); Eckert (2:2)	Summary	(1:1) Mathez (1:2) Wenk	Referee: (Switzerland) Hans Vogt Muttenz

17 August 1947 Pre-season	Basel (Switzerland)	3–1	(Switzerland) Biel-Bienne	Bodenacker, Breitenbach
16:00	Oberer (2x); Stöcklin (1x)	Summary	(1x) Ballaman	Attendance: 2,000; Referee: (Switzerland) Sannwald Sissach

23 August 1947 Pre-season	Basel (Switzerland)	3–0	(Luxembourg) FA Red Boys Differdange	Basel
	Finazzi (1:0); Weisshaar (2:0); Stöcklin (3:0)	Summary		Referee: (Switzerland) Hans Vogt Muttenz

24 August 1947 Pre-season	Basel (Switzerland)	2–0	(Switzerland) Nordstern Basel	Basel
	Stäuble (1:0); Stäuble (2:0)	Summary		Referee: (Switzerland) Sannwald Sissach

1 November 1947 Mid-season	Basel (Switzerland)	2–1	(Switzerland) Grasshopper Club	Landhof, Basel
	Müller 55' (1:1); Grether 80' (2:1)	Summary	20' (0:1) Quinche	Attendance: 3,500; Referee: (Switzerland) Schaub Basel

==== Winter break and mid-season ====
4 January 1948 Winter break	Basel (Switzerland)	5–3	(Switzerland) FC Birsfelden	Landhof, Basel
	Bader (1:1); Oberer (2:1); Bader (3:1); Vonthron (4:2); Wenk (5:3)	Summary	(1:0) Fischer (3:2) Bingetti (4:3) von Arx	Attendance: 1,200; Referee: (Switzerland) Schaub Basel

1 February 1948 Winter break	Winterthur XI (Switzerland)	0–2	(Switzerland) Basel	Schützenwiese, Winterthur
		Summary	86' (0:1) Martin; 90' (0:2) Bader	Attendance: 1,200; Referee: (Switzerland) Bertsche Neuhausen am Rheinfall

7 February 1948 Winter break	Basel (Switzerland)	1–2	(Czech Republic) SK Slezská Ostrava	Landhof, Basel
15:00	Bader 35' (1:1)	Summary	20' (0:1) Janik; 75' (1:2) Simonek	Attendance: 3,500; Referee: (Switzerland) Schürch Winterthur

8 February 1948 Winter break	Young Boys reserves (Switzerland)	0–8	(Switzerland) Basel	Schönenwerd
		Summary	(2x) Grether (2x) Monigatti (2x) Oberer (1x) Hägler (1x) Ch. Martin

14 February 1948 Winter break	Basel (Switzerland)	3–7	Austria Wien	Landhof, Basel
	44' (o.g. 1:1); Stäuble 47' (2:1) (o.g. 3:1)	Summary	2' (0:1) Stojaspal (I) (3:2) Melchior (I); 57' (3:3) Stojaspal (II); 68' (3:4) Stroh (I) (3:5) Stojaspal (I) (3:6) Melchior (I) (3:7) Melchior (I)	Attendance: 4,000; Referee: (Switzerland) Berner Basel

28 March 1948 Mid-season	Ferencvárosi TC (Hungary)	3–2	(Switzerland) Basel	Üllői úti stadion, Budapest
	Tihanyi 3' (1:0); Tihanyi 11' (2:0); Surányi 29' (3:0)	Summary	62' (3:1) Oberer; 68' (pen. 2:3)	Attendance: 20,000; Referee: (Hungary) Dorogi

29 March 1948 Mid-season	Újpesti Dózsa (Hungary)	5–0	(Switzerland) Basel	Budapest
	Varnai 19' (1:0); Krasznai (2:0) (3:0) (4:0) (5:0)	Summary

16 April 1948 Mid-season	Basel (Switzerland)	2–2	(Austria) First Vienna	Landhof, Basel
16:30	Oberer 17' (1:0); Bader 57' (2:1)	Summary	21' (1:1) Fischer; 66' (2:2) Fischer	Attendance: 3,500; Referee: (Switzerland) A. Sandoz Lausanne

12 May 1948 Mid-season	Basel (Switzerland)	0–5	(England) Birmingham City	Landhof, Basel
18:15		Summary	(2x) Dougall (2x) Slater (1x) Stewart	Attendance: 6,000; Referee: (Switzerland) DörflingerGrenchen

16 May 1948 Mid-season	Haute-Marne North XI (France)	3–5	(Switzerland) Basel	Saint-Dizier
	Goal	Summary	(2x) Stäuble (1x) Oberer (1x) Stöcklin

17 May 1948 Mid-season	Haute-Marne South XI (France)	2–2	(Switzerland) Basel	Chaumont
	Goal	Summary	(1x) Oberer (1x) Stäuble

=== Nationalliga ===
==== League matches ====
31 August 1947 Round 1	Servette	1–1	Basel	Charmilles Stadium, Geneva
	Tamini	Summary	21' (0:1) Stöcklin	Attendance: 3,500; Referee: (Switzerland) DörflingerGrenchen

6 September 1947 Round 2	Basel	2–2	Grasshopper Club	Landhof, Basel
16:30	Stöcklin 40' (1:2); Weisshaar 85' (2:2)	Summary	35' (0:1) Amadò; 37' (0:2) Quinche	Attendance: 6,500; Referee: (Switzerland) Scherz Bern

16 September 1947 Round 3	Young Fellows Zürich	5–0	Basel	Hardturm, Zürich
	Bossert 19' (1:0); Siegenthaler 29' (2:0); Siegenthaler 44' (3:0); Bossert 69' (4:0); Bossert (5:0)	Summary		Attendance: 6,000; Referee: (Switzerland) Merlotti Neuchâtel

28 September 1947 Round 4	Basel	0–0	Bellinzona	Landhof, Basel
		Summary		Attendance: 6,800; Referee: (Switzerland) Schmidsberger Zürich

5 October 1947 Round 5	FC Bern	2–0	Basel	Neufeld, Bern
15:00	Wyss 18' (1:0); Jundt 23' (2:0)	Summary		Attendance: 4,500; Referee: (Switzerland) W. Rufli Bremgarten

12 October 1947 Round 6	Basel	2–2	La Chaux-de-Fonds	Landhof, Basel
	Oberer 41' (pen. 1:1); Oberer 49' (2:1)	Summary	16' (0:1) Hermann; 83' (pen. 2:2) Busenhart; (yellow card) Amey	Attendance: 7,000; Referee: (Switzerland) Tschopp Delémont

19 October 1947 Round 7	Biel-Bienne	1–0	Basel	Gurzelen Stadion, Biel/Bienne
	Weibel 22' (1:0)	Summary		Attendance: 4,500; Referee: (Switzerland) Niederhauser Bern

9 November 1947 Round 8	Basel	1–3	Lausanne-Sport	Landhof, Basel
	Oberer 56' (1:1)	Summary	26' (0:1)Maillard (II); 84' (1:2) Monnard (1:3)	Attendance: 8,000; Referee: (Switzerland) Scherz Bern

16 November 1947 Round 9	Zürich	3–3	Basel	Letzigrund, Zürich
14:45	Bosshart 32' (1:1); Zanetti 56' (2:1); Zanetti 72' (3:2)	Summary	6' (0:1) Stöcklin; 61' (2:2) Suter; 79' (3:3) Oberer	Attendance: 4,000; Referee: (Switzerland) Grassi Balerna

23 November 1947 Round 10	Locarno	3–0	Basel	Stadio del Lido, Locarno
	Canetti 69' (1:0); Ernst 71' (pen. 2:0); Ernst 83' (3:0)	Summary		Attendance: 2,600; Referee: (Switzerland) Schürch Winterthur

30 November 1947 Round 11	Basel	0–1	Lugano	Landhof, Basel
14:30		Summary	69' (0:1) Daldini	Attendance: 8,000; Referee: (Switzerland) DörflingerGrenchen

14 December 1947 Round 12	Cantonal Neuchatel	0–2	Basel	Stade de la Maladière (1924), Neuchâtel
14:30		Summary	30' (0:1) Bader; 70' (0:2) Oberer	Attendance: 3,800; Referee: (Switzerland) Schürch Winterthur

21 December 1947 Round 13	Basel	2–2	Grenchen	Landhof, Basel
14:30	Wenk 50' (1:2); Bader 90' (2:2)	Summary	4' (0:1) Roth; 44' (0:2) Vuilleumier	Attendance: 3,500; Referee: (Switzerland) Jaggi Bern

22 February 1948 Round 14	Basel	3–2	Servette	Landhof, Basel
14:30	Stöcklin 30' (1:1); Grether 75' (2:2); Stäuble 86' (3:2)	Summary	15' (0:1) Stefano (II); 38' (1:2) Würgler	Attendance: 5,000; Referee: (Switzerland) Keller Seuzach

29 February 1948 Round 15	Grasshopper Club	3–0	Basel	Hardturm, Zürich
15:15	Mosimann 47' (1:0); Berbig 61' (2:0); Amadò (3:0)	Summary		Attendance: 6,000; Referee: (Switzerland) A. Sandoz Lausanne

14 March 1948 Round 16	Basel	2–1	Young Fellows Zürich	Landhof, Basel
15:00	Stäuble 57' (1:1); Stäuble 65' (2:1)	Summary	30' (0:1) Siegenthaler	Attendance: 6,700; Referee: (Switzerland) Merlotti Neuchâtel

21 March 1948 Round 17	Bellinzona	1–5	Basel	Stadio Comunale, Bellinzona
	Busenhart 37' (1:2)	Summary	25' (0:1) Stöcklin; 37' (0:2) Vonthron; 43' (1:3) Stöcklin; 87' (1:4) Stöcklin; 89' (pen. 1:5) Bopp	Attendance: 2,000; Referee: (Switzerland) Lutz Geneva

4 April 1948 Round 18	Basel	1–2	FC Bern	Landhof, Basel
15:00	Bopp 57' (1:0)	Summary	69' (1:1) Liechti; 79' (1:2) Rothenbühler	Attendance: 7,500; Referee: (Switzerland) Schürch Winterthur

11 April 1948 Round 19	La Chaux-de-Fonds	1–5	Basel	Stade Charrière, La Chaux-de-Fonds
15:00	Busenhart 62' (1:5)	Summary	3' (1:0) Stöcklin; 20' (2:0) Stöcklin; 35' (0:3) Bader; 50' (0:4) Stäuble; 55' (0:5) Stäuble	Attendance: 3,500; Referee: (Switzerland) Lutz Geneva

25 April 1948 Round 20	Basel	3–3	Biel-Bienne	Landhof, Basel
15:00	Suter 27' (1:1); Stöcklin 60' (2:3); Wenk 88' (3:3)	Summary	19' (0:1) Scholl; 48' (1:2) Scholl; 52' (1:3) Lempen	Attendance: 8,700; Referee: (Switzerland) Merlotti Neuchâtel

2 May 1948 Round 21	Lausanne-Sport	5–0	Basel	Olympique de la Pontaise, Lausanne
15:00	Friedländer (penalty missed) 48′ Nikolić 58' (1:0); Nikolić 67' (2:0); Nikolić 68' (3:0); Nikolić 73' (4:0); Nikolić 77' (5:0)	Summary		Attendance: 7,000; Referee: (Switzerland) E. Ruefer Bern

9 May 1948 Round 22	Basel	3–3	Zürich	Landhof, Basel
15:00	Suter 15' (1:0); Stöcklin 70' (2:2); Bopp 77' (pen. 3:2)	Summary	25' (1:1) Zanetti; 56' (1:2) Bosshard; 89' (pen. 3:3) Kohler	Attendance: 8,200; Referee: (Switzerland) von Wartburg Bern

23 May 1948 Round 23	Basel	2–1	Locarno	Landhof, Basel
	Bader 43' (1:1); Hügi (I) 90' (2:1)	Summary	20' (2:1) Neury	Attendance: 6,800; Referee: (Switzerland) Keller Seuzach

30 May 1948 Round 24	Lugano	1–1	Basel	Campo Marzio, Lugano
	Bergamini 60' (1:1)	Summary	21' (0:1) Stäuble	Attendance: 4,500; Referee: (Switzerland) Scherz Bern

6 June 1948 Round 25	Basel	4–1	Cantonal Neuchatel	Landhof, Basel
	Hügi (I) 33' (1:1); Stäuble 48' (2:1); Hügi (I) 50' (3;1); Stäuble 55' (4:1)	Summary	7' (0:1) Guillaume	Attendance: 5,100; Referee: (Switzerland) Lutz Geneva

13 June 1948 Round 26	Grenchen	2–2	Basel	Stadion Brühl, Grenchen
	Righetti (I) 17' (1:1); Righetti (II) 25' (2:1)	Summary	10' (0:1) Hügi (I); 46' (2:2)	Attendance: 1,500; Referee: (Switzerland) Schmidsberger Zürich

==== League standings ====
Pos	Team	Pld	W	D	L	GF	GA	GD	Pts	Relegation
1	Bellinzona	26	15	8	3	58	28	+30	38	Swiss Champions
2	Biel-Bienne	26	16	5	5	57	38	+19	37	
3	Lausanne-Sport	26	16	2	8	59	32	+27	34	
4	La Chaux-de-Fonds	26	12	4	10	73	54	+19	28	Swiss Cup winners
5	Servette	26	10	6	10	61	51	+10	26	
6	Grenchen	26	10	6	10	53	58	−5	26	
7	Locarno	26	10	5	11	43	45	−2	25	
8	Grasshopper Club	26	9	6	11	60	52	+8	24	
9	Zürich	26	10	4	12	54	60	−6	24	
10	Basel	26	7	10	9	44	51	−7	24	
11	Lugano	26	9	6	11	34	44	−10	24	
12	Young Fellows Zürich	26	9	5	12	41	45	−4	23	
13	FC Bern	26	8	5	13	28	56	−28	21	Relegated
14	Cantonal Neuchatel	26	2	6	18	34	85	−51	10	Relegated

Source: rsssf.com

=== Swiss Cup ===
26 October 1947 Round 3	Basel	7–0	SC Balerna	Landhof, Basel
	Oberer (3x); Suter (2x); Stäuble (2x)	Summary		Attendance: 2,500; Referee: (Switzerland) Schmidsberger Zürich

7 December 1947 Round 4	Basel	2–1	Zürich	Landhof, Basel
14:30	Oberer 12' (1:0); Bader 58' (2:0)	Summary	62' (2:1) Zanetti; (penalty missed) 67′ Bosshard	Attendance: 4,300; Referee: (Switzerland) Niederhauser Bern

27 December 1947 Round of 16	Basel	5–3	Locarno	Landhof, Basel
	Bader 30' (1:0); Oberer 35' (2:0); Wenk 40' (3:0); Oberer 44' (4:0); Hägler 65' (5:0)	Summary	(red card) 60' Visentin; 69' (pen. 5:1) Ernst; 78' (5:2) Ernst; 88' (5:3) Losa	Attendance: 4,000; Referee: (Switzerland) A. Sandoz Lausanne

11 January 1948 Quarter-final	La Chaux-de-Fonds	2–0	Basel	Stade Charrière, La Chaux-de-Fonds
14:30	Amey 37' (1:0); Hermann 38' (2:0)	Summary		Attendance: 7,500; Referee: (Switzerland) DörflingerGrenchen

== See also ==
- History of FC Basel
- List of FC Basel players
- List of FC Basel seasons

== Sources ==
- Rotblau: Jahrbuch Saison 2014/2015. Publisher: FC Basel Marketing AG. ISBN 978-3-7245-2027-6
- Die ersten 125 Jahre. Publisher: Josef Zindel im Friedrich Reinhardt Verlag, Basel. ISBN 978-3-7245-2305-5
- The FCB team 1947–48 at fcb-archiv.ch
- Switzerland 1947–48 by Erik Garin at Rec.Sport.Soccer Statistics Foundation
