= Mathez =

Mathez is a Swiss surname. Notable people with the surname include:

- Bernard Mathez (fl. 1940s), Swiss footballer
- Cynthia Mathez (born 1985), Swiss para-badminton player
- Guy Mathez (born 1946), Swiss football manager
