= 1946–47 BSC Young Boys season =

BSC Young Boys
1946–47 season
- Chairman: Otto Wirz
- Manager: Béla Volentik
- Stadium: Stadion Wankdorf
- Nationalliga A: 13th (relegated)
- Swiss Cup: Round of 32
- Biggest win: Servette 3–7 Young Boys
- Biggest defeat: Basel 8–1 Young Boys

The 1946–47 season was the 47th season in the history of Berner Sport Club Young Boys. The team played their home games at Stadion Wankdorf in Bern.

== Players ==
- Ernst Brechbühl
- Achille Siegrist
- Louis Gobet
- Albert Stoll
- Ernst Giacometti
- Walter Grütter
- Robert Weil
- Eugène Walaschek
- Hans Grütter
- Hans Blaser
- Charles Casali

== Competitions ==
Win Draw Loss

=== Overall record ===
Competition	First match	Last match	Starting round	Final position	Record							
Competition	First match	Last match	Starting round	Final position	Pld	W	D	L	GF	GA	GD	Win %
Nationalliga A	1 September 1946	22 June 1947	Matchday 1	12th	26	6	6	14	44	59	−15	23.08
Swiss Cup	17 November 1946	8 December 1946	3rd principal round	Round of 32	2	1	0	1	3	3	+0	50.00
Total					28	7	6	15	47	62	−15	25.00

Source: Competitions

=== Nationalliga A ===
==== League table ====
Pos	Team	Pld	W	D	L	GF	GA	GD	Pts	Qualification or relegation
10	Bellinzona	26	10	3	13	49	51	−2	23	
11	FC Bern	26	8	5	13	31	48	−17	21	
12	Cantonal Neuchatel	26	8	5	13	28	53	−25	21	
13	Young Boys	26	6	6	14	44	59	−15	18	Relegated to 1947–48 NLB
14	Urania Genève Sport	26	7	4	15	33	68	−35	18	Relegated to 1947–48 NLB

Source: rsssf.com
Rules for classification: 1) Points; 2) Goal difference within the league, however with play-off for qualifiers;

Pos	Team	Pld	W	D	L	GF	GA	GD	Pts	Qualification or relegation
1	FC Zürich	26	19	3	4	73	27	+46	41	NLB champions and promoted to 1947–48 NLA
2	FC La Chaux-de-Fonds	26	19	2	5	92	33	+59	40	Promoted to 1947–48 NLA
3	FC Aarau	26	15	6	5	50	26	+24	36	
4	FC St. Gallen	26	10	9	7	47	38	+9	29	
5	FC Luzern	26	10	8	8	53	43	+10	28	
6	FC Fribourg	26	10	7	9	37	37	0	27	
7	CS International Genève	26	12	3	11	42	42	0	27	
8	FC Nordstern Basel	26	10	4	12	43	43	0	24	
9	FC Schaffhausen	26	7	9	10	50	70	−20	23	
10	FC Thun	26	9	4	13	33	64	−31	22	
11	SC Brühl	26	8	5	13	39	49	−10	21	
12	SC Zug	26	9	2	15	46	52	−6	20	
13	FC Red Star Zürich	26	7	5	14	33	54	−21	19	Relegated to 1947–48 1. Liga
14	FC Helvetia Bern	26	3	1	22	28	88	−60	7	Relegated to 1947–48 1. Liga

Source: rsssf.com
Rules for classification: 1) Points; 2) Goal difference within the league, however with play-off for qualifiers;

==== Matches ====
1 September 1946 Round 1	Young Boys	1–2	Bellinzona	Bern
	Eugène Walaschek 32'		Alessandro Frigerio 18', 30'	Stadium: Stadion Wankdorf; Attendance: 2,500; Referee: (Switzerland) Ernst Dörflinger

8 September 1946 Round 2	Basel	8–1	Young Boys	Landhof, Basel
	Oberer 12' (1:1); Bader 20' (2:1); Mathez (3:1); Oberer 60' (4:1); Bader (5:1); Bader (6:1); Mathez (7:1); Oberer (8:1)	Summary	3' (0:1) Streun	Attendance: 5,800; Referee: (Switzerland) A. Sandoz Lausanne

22 September 1946 Round 3	Young Boys	2–2	FC Bern	Bern
				Stadium: Stadion Wankdorf; Attendance: 6,500; Referee: (Switzerland) Rosenbaum

29 September 1946 Round 4	Cantonal Neuchâtel	2–0	Young Boys	Neuchâtel
				Stadium: Stade de la Maladière; Attendance: 3,300

6 October 1946 Round 5	Young Boys	3–0	Urania Genève	Bern
				Stadium: Stadion Wankdorf; Attendance: 3,500; Referee: (Switzerland) Louis Tschopp

13 October 1946 Round 6	Grasshopper Club Zürich	2–2	Young Boys	Zürich
				Stadium: Hardturm; Attendance: 4,500; Referee: (Switzerland) Adrien Sandoz

20 October 1946 Round 7	Young Boys	1–2	Lugano	Bern
				Stadium: Stadion Wankdorf; Attendance: 6,000; Referee: (Switzerland) Joseph Schürch

27 October 1946 Round 8	Locarno	2–2	Young Boys	Locarno
				Stadium: Stadio del Lido; Attendance: 1,900; Referee: (Switzerland) Willy Rufli

3 November 1946 Round 9	Young Boys	2–3	Biel-Bienne	Bern
				Stadium: Stadion Wankdorf; Attendance: 6,500; Referee: (Switzerland) Ernst Dörflinger

24 November 1946 Round 10	Young Boys	0–0	Lausanne-Sport	Bern
				Stadium: Stadion Wankdorf; Attendance: 5,000; Referee: (Switzerland) Louis Tschopp

1 December 1946 Round 11	Grenchen	2–1	Young Boys	Grenchen
				Stadium: Stadion Brühl; Attendance: 1,000; Referee: (Switzerland) Joseph Schürch

15 December 1946 Round 12	Young Boys	3–3	Servette	Bern
				Stadium: Stadion Wankdorf; Attendance: 3,000; Referee: (Switzerland) Hans Vogt

22 December 1946 Round 13	Young Fellows Zürich	1–0	Young Boys	Zürich
				Stadium: Letzigrund; Attendance: 3,000; Referee: (Switzerland) Louis Tschopp

23 February 1947 Round 15	Young Boys	P–P	Basel	Wankdorf Stadium, Bern
		[ Summary]

9 March 1947 Round 14	Bellinzona	4–1	Young Boys	Bellinzona
				Stadium: Stadio Comunale di Bellinzona; Attendance: 2,500; Referee: (Switzerland) Ernst Dörflinger

16 March 1947 Round 17	Young Boys	3–4	Cantonal Neuchâtel	Bern
				Stadium: Stadion Wankdorf; Attendance: 4,000; Referee: (Switzerland) Joseph Schürch

23 March 1947 Round 18	Urania Genève	4–3	Young Boys	Geneva
				Stadium: Stade de Frontenex; Attendance: 4,000; Referee: (Switzerland) Leopold Schmidsberger

30 March 1947 Round 19	Young Boys	3–2	Grasshopper Club Zürich	Bern
				Stadium: Stadion Wankdorf; Attendance: 6,000; Referee: (Switzerland) Hans Vogt

13 April 1947 Round 20	Lugano	0–0	Young Boys	Lugano
				Stadium: Campo Marzio; Attendance: 2,500; Referee: (Switzerland) Louis Tschopp

20 April 1947 Round 21	Young Boys	1–3	Locarno	Bern
				Stadium: Stadion Wankdorf; Attendance: 4,000; Referee: (Switzerland) Hans Vogt

27 April 1947 Round 15	Young Boys	2–0	Basel	Wankdorf Stadium, Bern
	Stoll 77' (1:0); Grütter 78' (2:0)	Summary		Attendance: 3,500; Referee: (Switzerland) Rapin Lausanne

4 May 1947 Round 22	FC Biel-Bienne	3–0	Young Boys	Biel/Bienne
				Stadium: Stadion Gurzelen; Attendance: 5,200; Referee: (Switzerland) Jean Lutz

11 May 1947 Round 23	Lausanne-Sport	0–1	Young Boys	Lausanne
				Stadium: Stade de la Pontaise; Attendance: 6,000; Referee: (Switzerland) Leopold Schmidsberger

18 May 1947 Round 16	FC Bern	1–2	Young Boys	Bern
				Stadium: Stadion Neufeld; Attendance: 8,500; Referee: (Switzerland) Jean Lutz

1 June 1947 Round 24	Young Boys	1–3	Grenchen	Bern
				Stadium: Stadion Wankdorf; Attendance: 3,000; Referee: (Switzerland) Louis Tschopp

15 June 1947 Round 25	Servette	3–7	Young Boys	Geneva
				Stadium: Stade des Charmilles; Attendance: 3,800; Referee: (Switzerland) Leopold Schmidsberger

22 June 1947 Round 26	Young Boys	2–3	Young Fellows Zürich	Bern
	Hans Blaser 40'; Robert Weil 88'		Aldo Zappia 63'; Hans Siegenthaler 73'; Walter Wälchli 76'	Stadium: Stadion Wankdorf; Attendance: 4,500; Referee: (Switzerland) Roger Rapin

=== Swiss Cup ===
17 November 1946 3rd principal round	Young Boys	2–0	Gardy-Jonction GE	Bern
				Stadium: Stadion Wankdorf

8 December 1946 Round of 32	Young Boys	1–3	Grenchen	Bern
				Stadium: Stadion Wankdorf
