= Oswald Capra =

Swiss footballer (born 1929)

Personal information
- Full name: Oswald Capra
- Date of birth: 4 June 1929
- Position: Goalkeeper

Senior career*
Years	Team	Apps	(Gls)
1950–1952	FC Basel	6	(0)
- * Club domestic league appearances and goals

Oswald Capra (born 4 June 1929) is a Swiss former footballer who played as goalkeeper.

Capra joined FC Basel's first team for their 1950–51 season under player-coach Ernst Hufschmid. After playing in two test matches Capra played his domestic league debut for the club in the away game on 10 December 1950 as Basel were defeated 1–3 by Lausanne-Sport.

Between the years 1948 and 1950 Capra played a total of ten games for Basel. Six of these games were in the Nationalliga A and four were friendly games.

== Sources ==
- Die ersten 125 Jahre. Publisher: Josef Zindel im Friedrich Reinhardt Verlag, Basel. ISBN 978-3-7245-2305-5
- Verein "Basler Fussballarchiv" Homepage
