= Max Sutter =

Swiss footballer

Personal information
- Full name: Max Sutter
- Date of birth: unknown
- Place of birth: Switzerland
- Date of death: unknown
- Position: Defender

Senior career*
Years	Team	Apps	(Gls)
1950–1952	FC Basel	24	(2)
1952–	Concordia Basel		
- * Club domestic league appearances and goals

Max Sutter was a Swiss footballer who played for FC Basel. He played as defender.

Sutter joined FC Basel's first team for their 1950–51 season under player-coach Ernst Hufschmid. In his first season with the club Sutter only played in test matches. After ten test games Sutter played his domestic league debut for the club in the home game at the Landhof on 26 August 1951 as Basel won 6–1 against Young Fellows Zürich. He scored his first goal for his club one week later on 2 September in the home game as Basel won 3–2 against Lausanne-Sport.

In the two seasons that he was with the club Sutter played a total of 42 games for Basel scoring a total of seven goals. 24 of these games were in the Nationalliga A, five in the Swiss Cup and 13 were friendly games. He scored two goals in the domestic league, two in the cup competition and the other three were scored during the test games.

Following his time with FC Basel Sutter moved on to play for Concordia Basel, who at that time played in a lower league.

== Sources ==
- Die ersten 125 Jahre. Publisher: Josef Zindel im Friedrich Reinhardt Verlag, Basel. ISBN 978-3-7245-2305-5
- Verein "Basler Fussballarchiv" Homepage

(NB: Despite all efforts, the editors of these books and the authors in "Basler Fussballarchiv" have failed to be able to identify all the players, their date and place of birth or date and place of death, who played in the games during the early years of FC Basel)
