= René Hebinger =

French footballer (1921-2008)

Personal information
- Date of birth: 22 July 1921
- Place of birth: Bourtzwiller, Mulhouse, Haut-Rhin, France
- Date of death: 19 August 2008 (aged 87)
- Place of death: Mulhouse, Haut-Rhin, France
- Height: 1.72 m (5 ft 8 in)
- Position: Striker

Senior career*
Years	Team	Apps	(Gls)
1946–1949	FC Mulhouse		
1949–1950	FC Basel	3	(0)
1950–1951	FC Mulhouse		

International career
1948	France Olympic	1	(0)
- * Club domestic league appearances and goals

René Hebinger (22 June 1921 – 19 August 2008) was a French footballer. He competed in the men's tournament at the 1948 Summer Olympics.

== Club career ==
Born in Bourtzwiller Hebinger played for local club FC Mulhouse as striker. He joined Basel's first team during their 1949–50 season. After playing in one test game, he played his Nationalliga A debut for his new club in the home game at the Landhof on 16 April 1950 as Basel won 3–2 against Lugano.

In his one season by Basel, Hebinger played a total of four games for Basel scoring one goal. Three of these games were in the Nationalliga A and the other was a friendly game. He scored this goal on 10 April 1950 in a tournament in Liège against LASK (Linzer Athletik-Sport-Klub) as Basel were defeated 1–3.

Following his time in Basel Hebinger returned to play for Mulhouse.

== International career ==
He was selected in France Football squad for the 1948 Summer Olympics. He was an unused substitute for the match against India but played the game against Great Britain as France were eliminated in the Quarterfinals. He never had a cap with France senior team.

== Sources ==
- Die ersten 125 Jahre. Publisher: Josef Zindel im Friedrich Reinhardt Verlag, Basel. ISBN 978-3-7245-2305-5
- Verein "Basler Fussballarchiv" Homepage
