= Peter Baumgartner (footballer) =

Swiss footballer

Personal information
- Full name: Peter Baumgartner
- Place of birth: Switzerland
- Position: Forward

Senior career*
Years	Team	Apps	(Gls)
1950–1951	FC Basel	3	(0)
- * Club domestic league appearances and goals

Peter Baumgartner is a Swiss former footballer who played as a forward.

Baumgartner joined FC Basel's first team for their 1950–51 season under player-coach Ernst Hufschmid. Baumgartner made his domestic league debut for the club on 5 November 1950 as Basel lost 5–0 away to Locarno.

Baumgartner played one season for Basel. He played four games without scoring a goal. Three of these games were in the Nationalliga A and the other was the test game. The test match was against Bolton Wanderers on 22 May 1950 and Basel won by one goal to nil.

== Sources ==
- Die ersten 125 Jahre. Publisher: Josef Zindel im Friedrich Reinhardt Verlag, Basel. ISBN 978-3-7245-2305-5
- Verein "Basler Fussballarchiv" Homepage

(NB: Despite all efforts, the editors of these books and the authors in "Basler Fussballarchiv" have failed to be able to identify all the players, their date and place of birth or date and place of death, who played in the games during the early years of FC Basel)
