= 1946–47 FC Basel season =

FC Basel
1946–47 season
- Chairman: Jules Düblin
- Manager: Anton Schall
- Ground: Landhof, Basel
- Nationalliga A: 4th
- Swiss Cup: Winners
- Top goalscorer: League: Traugott Oberer (13); All: Traugott Oberer (16)
- Highest home attendance: 10,000 on 20 April 1947 vs Biel-Bienne
- Lowest home attendance: 3,500 on 16 February 1947 vs Locarno
- Average home league attendance: 6,515

The 1946–47 season was Fussball Club Basel 1893's Fifty-fourth season in their existence. It was their first season in the top flight of Swiss football after their promotion from the Nationalliga B the season before. They played their home games in the Landhof, in the Quarter Kleinbasel. Jules Düblin was the club's new chairman and he took over this position from Emil Junkerat the club's AGM. Düblin had been player for FC Basel in the years 1919–1926 and had been on the club's board of directors. He was doctor, banker and politician, became author and private art collector.

== Overview ==
After his playing career the Austrian ex-international Anton Schall, who suffered from a rare heart condition, moved to Switzerland and took over Basel as club trainer for the 1946–47 season. Basel played a total of 39 games in this season. Of these 26 in the Nationalliga A, six in the Swiss Cup and seven were test games. The test games resulted with three victories, three draws and one defeat. In total, they won 21 games, drew eight and lost 10 times. In total, including the test games and the cup competition, they scored 111 goals and conceded 65.

There were fourteen teams contesting in the 1946–47 Nationalliga A, the bottom two teams in the table to be relegated. Basel finished their season in fourth position in the table, with twelve victories from 26 games, scoring in total 60 goals. Traugott Oberer was the team's top goal scorer. René Bader and Hermann Suter were joint second best, each with 10 goals. FC Biel-Bienne won the championship. Young Boys and ended the season on the relegation places.

In the Swiss Cup Basel started in round 3 with a home match against local team Black Stars Basel, the game was won 3– 2. In round 4 they had an away tie against La Chaux-de-Fonds which was won 2–1. Round 5 gave Basel another home tie in the Landhof against another local club Nordstern and this ended with a 6–1 victory. Thus they advanced to the quarter-finals and were matched against the Grasshoppers. The Grasshoppers were beaten 2–1. In the semi-final goals from top scorers Traugott Oberer and René Bader gave Basel a 2–1 victory against Grenchen. Therefore, Basel advanced to the Cup-Final, which was played in the Stadion Neufeld in Bern on 7 April 1947. Basel won the final 3–0 against Lausanne Sport and thus their second cup title. In the Final Paul Stöcklin scored two goals and Bader the other. Schall led Basel to win the Cup, but he died shortly afterwards at the age of 40 years during a workout on the football field. Following this unhappy event captain Ernst Hufschmid later took over as team coach.

== Players ==
Note: Flags indicate national team as defined under FIFA eligibility rules; some limited exceptions apply. Players may hold more than one non-FIFA nationality.

No.	Pos.	Nation	Player
—	GK	SUI	Walter Müller
—	GK	SUI	Kurt Imhof
—	GK	SUI	Hans Rothen
—	DF	SUI	Werner Bopp
—	DF	SUI	Ernst Grauer
—	DF	SUI	Ernst Hufschmid
—	MF	SUI	Alexander Ebner
—	MF	SUI	Heinz Elsässer
—	MF	SUI	Rodolfo Kappenberger
—	MF	SUI	Kurt Maurer
—	MF	SUI	Willy Monigatti

No.	Pos.	Nation	Player
—	FW	SUI	Traugott Oberer
—	MF	SUI	Hans Vonthron
—	MF	SUI	Werner Wenk
—	MF	SUI	Rudolf Wirz
—	FW	SUI	René Bader
—	FW	SUI	Walter Bosshard
—	FW	SUI	Fritz Eckert
—	FW	SUI	Bernard Mathez
—	FW	SUI	Paul Stöcklin
—	FW	SUI	Hermann Suter
—	FW	SUI	Alfred Weisshaar

== Results ==
=== Legend ===
Win Draw Loss Postponed

=== Friendly matches ===
==== Pre-season ====
8 August 1946 Pre-season	Basel (Switzerland)	3–3	(Switzerland) Grenchen	Weiden, Dornach
	Eckert (1:0); Stöcklin (2:1); Eckert (3:3)	Summary	(1:1) Righetti (I) (2:2) Perroud (2:3) Righetti (II)	Attendance: 2,000; Referee: (Switzerland) Hofer Moutier

18 August 1946 Pre-season	FC Langnau (Switzerland)	1–11	(Switzerland) Basel	Sägematte, Langnau im Emmental
	Nenniger (1:3)	Summary	17' (0:1) Bader (0:2) Bader; 30' (0:3) Stöcklin; 41' (1:4) Bader; 60' (1:5) Hufschmid; 67' (1:6) Bader (pen. 1:7) Oberer (1:8) Stöcklin (1:9) Bader; 81' (1:10) Wenk (1:11) Stöcklin	Attendance: 600; Referee: (Switzerland) Baumgartner Langnau im Emmental

25 August 1946 Pre-season	Red Star Zürich (Switzerland)	2–2	(Switzerland) Basel	Sportanlage Allmend Brunau, Zürich
	Ryffel 12' (1:0); Bieri (pen. 2:0)	Summary	(pen. 2:1) Oberer (2:2) Bader	Attendance: 1,000; Referee: (Switzerland) Faust Oerlikon

==== Winter break ====
5 January 1947 Winter break	Basel (Switzerland)	2–2	(Hungary) Ferencvárosi	Landhof, Basel
	Oberer (pen. 1:2); Weisshaar (2:2)	Summary	(0:1) Gyulai (0:2) Mike; (red card) Mike	Attendance: 2,200; Referee: (Switzerland) Berner Basel

1 February 1947 Winter break	Basel (Switzerland)	2–1	(Switzerland) Concordia Basel	Landhof, Basel
	Stöcklin (1:1); Oberer (2:1)	Summary	(o.g. 0:1) Bopp	Referee: (Switzerland) Steiner Basel

9 March 1947 Winter break	Basel (Switzerland)	12–1	(Switzerland) SC Binningen	Landhof, Basel
	Weisshaar 5' (1:1); Weisshaar (2:1); Stöcklin (3:1); Suter (4:1); Suter (5:1); Oberer (6:1); Suter (7:1); Wenk (8:1); Suter (9:1) (o.g. 10:1); Suter (11:1); Suter (12:1)	Summary	(0:1) M. Dättwyler	Referee: (Switzerland) Berner Basel

7 June 1947 Mid-season	Basel (Switzerland)	1–4	(France) RC Strasbourg	Landhof, Basel
17:00	Monigatti 89' (1:4)	Summary	44' (0:1) Vanags; 65' (0:2) Woehl; 80' (0:3) Nyers; 82' (0:4) Roland	Attendance: 3,700; Referee: (Switzerland) Dörflinger Grenchen

=== Nationalliga ===
==== League matches ====
1 September 1946 Round 1	Locarno	0–2	Basel	Stadio del Lido, Locarno
		Summary	38' (0:1) Stöcklin; 64' (0:2) Suter	Attendance: 2,000; Referee: (Switzerland) Jaggi Bern

8 September 1946 Round 2	Basel	8–1	Young Boys	Landhof, Basel
	Oberer 12' (1:1); Bader 20' (2:1); Mathez (3:1); Oberer 60' (4:1); Bader (5:1); Bader (6:1); Mathez (7:1); Oberer (8:1)	Summary	3' (0:1) Streun	Attendance: 5,800; Referee: (Switzerland) A. Sandoz Lausanne

22 September 1946 Round 3	Lausanne-Sport	7–0	Basel	Olympique de la Pontaise, Lausanne
15:00	Guhl 7' (1:0); Maillard (II) 12' (2:0); Nikolić 25' (3:0); Eggimann 60' (4:0); Monnard 67' (5:0); Maillard (II) (6:0); Monnard 85' (7:0)	Summary		Attendance: 8,000; Referee: (Switzerland) Schürch Winterthur

29 September 1946 Round 4	Basel	1–0	Grenchen	Landhof, Basel
	Mathez 17' (1:0)	Summary		Attendance: 6,000; Referee: (Switzerland) Grassi Balerna

6 October 1946 Round 5	Servette	3–2	Basel	Charmilles Stadium, Geneva
	Tamini 42' (1:2); Buchoux 82' (2:2); Facchinetti 88' (3:2)	Summary	18' (0:1) Stöcklin; 45' (0:2) Stöcklin	Attendance: 7,200; Referee: (Switzerland) Scherz Bern

13 October 1946 Round 6	Basel	3–2	Young Fellows Zürich	Landhof, Basel
15:00	Bader 3' (1:1); Stöcklin 15' (2:1); Bader 36' (3:1)	Summary	1' (0:1) Fink (II); 50' (3:2) Zappia	Attendance: 6,000; Referee: (Switzerland) von Wartburg Bern

20 October 1946 Round 7	Bellinzona	4–1	Basel	Stadio Comunale, Bellinzona
	Ruch 46' (1:0); Ruch 48' (2:0); Frigerio 60' (3:0); Frigerio 72' (4:1)	Summary	65' (3:1) Mathez	Attendance: 2,000; Referee: (Switzerland) von Wartburg Bern

27 October 1946 Round 8	Biel-Bienne	1–3	Basel	Gurzelen Stadion, Biel/Bienne
	Wiedmer 42' (1:0)	Summary	52' (1:1) Suter; 56' (1:2) Weisshaar; 77' (1:3) Suter	Attendance: 4,500; Referee: (Switzerland) Jaggi Bern

3 November 1946 Round 9	Basel	1–1	FC Bern	Landhof, Basel
	Wenk 88' (1:1)	Summary	8' (0:1) Jauner (II)	Attendance: 6,200; Referee: (Switzerland) W. Rufli Bremgarten

24 November 1946 Round 10	Cantonal Neuchatel	2–3	Basel	Stade de la Maladière (1924), Neuchâtel
14:30	Guillaume 10' (pen. 1:0); Guillaume 81' (pen. 2:3)	Summary	(1:1) Wenk (1:2) Stöcklin (pen. 1:3) Oberer	Attendance: 2,600; Referee: (Switzerland) Scherz Bern

1 December 1946 Round 11	Basel	8–2	Urania Genève Sport	Landhof, Basel
	Oberer (pen. 1:0); Bader 15' (2:0); Suter (3:1); Oberer (4:1); Bader (5:1); Oberer (6:2); Suter (7:2); Suter (8:2)	Summary	(2:1) Prod'hom (5:2) Prod'hom	Attendance: 4,000; Referee: (Switzerland) Tschopp Delémont

December 1946 Round 12	Grasshopper Club	P–P	Basel	Hardturm, Zürich
		[ Summary]

22 December 1946 Round 13	Basel	1–0	Lugano	Landhof, Basel
	Suter 67' (1:0)	Summary		Attendance: 7,500; Referee: (Switzerland) Schürch Winterthur

16 February 1947 Round 14	Basel	6–0	Locarno	Landhof, Basel
	Stöcklin 30' (1:0); Suter 35' (2:0); Oberer 30' (pen. 3:0); Bader 63' (4:0); Bader 65' (5:0); Oberer 75' (6:0)	Summary		Attendance: 3,500; Referee: (Switzerland) Jaggi Bern

February 1947 Round 15	Young Boys	P–P	Basel	Wankdorf Stadium, Bern
		[ Summary]

March 1947 Round 16	Basel	P–P	Lausanne-Sport	Landhof, Basel
		[ Summary]

March 1947 Round 17	Grenchen	P–P	Basel	Stadion Brühl, Grenchen
		[ Summary]

23 March 1947 Round 18	Basel	5–1	Servette	Landhof, Basel
15:00	Wenk 18' (1:1); Stöcklin 22' (2:1); Suter 44' (3:1); Wenk 53' (4:1); Oberer 88' (5:1)	Summary	7' (0:1) Facchinetti	Attendance: 8,500; Referee: (Switzerland) Niederhauser BernW

30 March 1947 Round 19	Young Fellows Zürich	2–2	Basel	Letzigrund, Zürich
15:40	Wälchli 28' (1:0); Siegenthaler 33' (2:0)	Summary	84' (2:1) Vonthron; 86' (2:2) Wenk	Attendance: 9,500; Referee: (Switzerland) Scherz Bern

13 April 1947 Round 20	Basel	4–1	Bellinzona	Landhof, Basel
	Hufschmid 12' (1:0); Kappenberger 40' (2:0); Hufschmid 45' (3:0); Kappenberger 65' (4:0)	Summary	75' (4:1) Frigerio	Attendance: 7,700; Referee: (Switzerland) A. Sandoz Lausanne

20 April 1947 Round 21	Basel	1–3	Biel-Bienne	Landhof, Basel
	Bader (penalty missed) 26′ Wenk 30' (1:2)	Summary	15' (0:1) Lempen; 28' (0:2) Scheurer; 58' (1:3) Weibel	Attendance: 10,000; Referee: (Switzerland) Wittwer Geneva

27 April 1947 Round 15	Young Boys	2–0	Basel	Wankdorf Stadium, Bern
	Stoll 77' (1:0); Grütter 78' (2:0)	Summary		Attendance: 3,500; Referee: (Switzerland) Rapin Lausanne

4 May 1947 Round 22	FC Bern	1–1	Basel	Neufeld, Bern
	Liechti 29' (pen. 1:0)	Summary	51' (1:1) Hufschmid	Attendance: 3,500; Referee: (Switzerland) Merlotti Neuchâtel

11 May 1947 Round 26	Lugano	2–1	Basel	Campo Marzio, Lugano
	Bossoni 7' (pedn. 1:0); Bernasconi 37' (2:0)	Summary	61' (2:1) Oberer	Attendance: 2,500; Referee: (Switzerland) Scherz Bern

24 May 1947 Round 16	Basel	1–1	Lausanne-Sport	Landhof, Basel
16:30	Bader 63' (1:1)	Summary	56' (0:1) Nicolic	Attendance: 9,000; Referee: (Switzerland) W. Rufli Bremgarten

1 June 1947 Round 24	Urania Genève Sport	0–0	Basel	Stade de Frontenex, Geneva
		Summary		Attendance: 3,500; Referee: (Switzerland) E. Ruefer Bern

14 June 1947 Round 25	Basel	0–1	Grasshopper Club	Landhof, Basel
		Summary	65' (0:1) Berbig	Attendance: 6,200; Referee: (Switzerland) von Wartburg Bern

21 June 1947 Round 26	Basel	5–1	Cantonal Neuchatel	Landhof, Basel
	Oberer 9' (pen. 1:1); Kappenberger 14' (2:1); Oberer 40' (3:1); Suter 42' (4:1); Bopp 72' (pen. 5:1)	Summary	4' (0:1) Sydler; (penalty missed) 64′ Guillaume	Attendance: 4,300; Referee: (Switzerland) Lutz Geneva

25 June 1947 Round 12	Grasshopper Club	4–0	Basel	Hardturm, Zürich
	Bickel (I) 53' (1:0); Grauer 73' (o.g. 2:0); Biedermann 83' (3:0); Amadò 88' (4:0)	Summary	(red card) 58' Bader	Attendance: 2,500; Referee: (Switzerland) Lutz Geneva

28 June 1947 Round 17	Grenchen	3–1	Basel	Stadion Brühl, Grenchen
	Ardizzoni 20' (1:0); Righetti (II) 58' (2:1); Sommer 82' (3:1)	Summary	39' (1:1) Stöcklin	Attendance: 1,000; Referee: (Switzerland) Rapin Lausanne

==== League table ====
Pos	Team	Pld	W	D	L	GF	GA	GD	Pts	Qualification
1	Biel-Bienne	26	14	8	4	60	32	+28	36	Swiss Champions
2	Lausanne-Sport	26	15	5	6	44	25	+19	35	
3	Lugano	26	10	11	5	34	26	+8	31	
4	Basel	26	12	5	9	60	45	+15	29	Swiss Cup winners
5	Servette	26	11	6	9	54	49	+5	28	
6	Grasshopper Club	26	12	3	11	61	42	+19	27	
7	Grenchen	26	10	6	10	36	30	+6	26	
8	Young Fellows Zürich	26	9	8	9	49	46	+3	26	
9	Locarno	26	10	5	11	41	50	−9	25	
10	Bellinzona	26	10	3	13	49	51	−2	23	
11	FC Bern	26	8	5	13	31	48	−17	21	
12	Cantonal Neuchatel	26	8	5	13	28	53	−25	21	
13	Young Boys	26	6	6	14	44	59	−15	18	Relegated
14	Urania Genève Sport	26	7	4	15	33	68	−35	18	Relegated

Source: rsssf.com

=== Swiss Cup ===
17 November 1946 Round 3	Basel	3–2	Black Stars Basel	Landhof, Basel
	Bader 5' (1:0); Suter 66' (2:0); Bader 75' (3:0)	Summary	76' (3:1) Horrisberger; 85' (3:2) Schmid	Attendance: 3,000; Referee: (Switzerland) Jaggi Bern

8 December 1946 Round 4	La Chaux-de-Fonds	1–2	Basel	Stade Charrière, La Chaux-de-Fonds
14:30	Kernen 55' (1:1)	Summary	30' (0:1) Wenk; 70' (1:2) Oberer	Attendance: 3,800; Referee: (Switzerland) Wittwer Geneva

29 December 1946 Round of 16	Basel	6–1	Nordstern	Landhof, Basel
	Suter 15' (1:1); Grauer 32' (2:1); Stöcklin 34' (3:1); Vonthron 60' (4:1); Oberer 75' (5:1); Bader 88' (6:1)	Summary	2' (0:1) Hütter	Attendance: 8,000; Referee: (Switzerland) A. Sandoz Lausanne

9 February 1947 Quarter-final	Basel	2–1	Grasshoppers	Landhof, Basel
14:30	Wenk 62' (1:1); Grauer 80' (2:1)	Summary	60' (0:1) Amadò	Attendance: 8,000; Referee: (Switzerland) Scherz Bern

16 March 1947 Semi-final	Basel	2–1	Grenchen	Stadion Rankhof, Basel
15:00	Oberer 32' (1:1); Bader 52' (2:1)	Summary	22' (0:1) Zadra	Attendance: 14,000; Referee: (Switzerland) Scherz Bern

7 April 1947 Final	Basel	3–0	Lausanne Sport	Stadion Neufeld, Bern
15:00	Stöcklin 48' (1:0); Bader 82' (2:0); Stöcklin 86' (3:0)	Summary		Attendance: 28,000; Referee: (Switzerland) Schürch Winterthur

== See also ==
- History of FC Basel
- List of FC Basel players
- List of FC Basel seasons

== Sources ==
- Rotblau: Jahrbuch Saison 2014/2015. Publisher: FC Basel Marketing AG. ISBN 978-3-7245-2027-6
- Die ersten 125 Jahre. Publisher: Josef Zindel im Friedrich Reinhardt Verlag, Basel. ISBN 978-3-7245-2305-5
- The FCB team 1946–47 at fcb-archiv.ch
- Switzerland 1946–47 by Erik Garin at Rec.Sport.Soccer Statistics Foundation
