= Otto Krieg =

Swiss footballer

Personal information
- Full name: Otto Krieg
- Date of birth: unknown
- Place of birth: Switzerland
- Date of death: unknown
- Position: Midfielder

Senior career*
Years	Team	Apps	(Gls)
until 1950	FC Birsfelden		
1949–1950	FC Basel	8	(1)
1950–	FC Birsfelden		
- * Club domestic league appearances and goals

Otto Krieg was a Swiss footballer who played as midfielder.

Krieg first played for FC Birsfelden and together with Otto Soltermann they joined FC Basel's first team for their 1949–50 season under player-coach Ernst Hufschmid. After playing in two test matches Krieg played his domestic league debut for his new club in the away game on 13 November 1949 against Zürich. He scored his first goal for the club in the same match, but this did not save the team from a 2–5 defeat.

In his one season with the club Krieg played a total of 14 games for Basel scoring two goals. Eight of these games were in the Nationalliga A, two were in the Swiss Cup and the other four were friendly games. He scored that one mentioned league goal and the other in a cup game.

Following their one season in Basel Krieg and Soltermann returned to play for FC Birsfelden.

== Sources ==
- Rotblau: Jahrbuch Saison 2017/2018. Publisher: FC Basel Marketing AG. ISBN 978-3-7245-2189-1
- Die ersten 125 Jahre. Publisher: Josef Zindel im Friedrich Reinhardt Verlag, Basel. ISBN 978-3-7245-2305-5
- Verein "Basler Fussballarchiv" Homepage

(NB: Despite all efforts, the editors of these books and the authors in "Basler Fussballarchiv" have failed to be able to identify all the players, their date and place of birth or date and place of death, who played in the games during the early years of FC Basel)
