= Eugen Müller (footballer) =

Swiss footballer

Personal information
- Full name: Eugen Müller
- Date of birth: 5. March 1927
- Place of birth: Switzerland
- Date of death: 11. August 2024
- Position: Midfielder

Senior career*
Years	Team	Apps	(Gls)
1950–1951	FC Basel	2	(0)
- * Club domestic league appearances and goals

Eugen Müller is a Swiss former footballer who played as midfielder.

Müller joined FC Basel's first team for their 1950–51 season under player-coach Ernst Hufschmid. After five test games Müller played his domestic league debut for the club in the away game on 3 September 1950 as Basel played 1–1 against Biel-Bienne.

Müller played just one season with the club. He played a total of eight games for Basel, without scoring a goal. Two of these games were in the Nationalliga A, one was in the Swiss Cup and the other five were friendly games.

== Sources ==
- Die ersten 125 Jahre. Publisher: Josef Zindel im Friedrich Reinhardt Verlag, Basel. ISBN 978-3-7245-2305-5
- Verein "Basler Fussballarchiv" Homepage

(NB: Despite all efforts, the editors of these books and the authors in "Basler Fussballarchiv" have failed to be able to identify all the players, their date and place of birth or date and place of death, who played in the games during the early years of FC Basel)
