= Richard Fischer =

Austrian footballer

Personal information
- Date of birth: 27 January 1917
- Date of death: 1969
- Position: Forward

Senior career*
Years	Team	Apps	(Gls)
1937–1952	Vienna	165	(132)

International career
1937–1945	Austria	3	(0)

Managerial career
- 1958–1959: Vienna
- * Club domestic league appearances and goals

Richard Fischer (27 January 1917 – 1969) was an Austrian international footballer.
