= Bourtzwiller =

Neighborhood of Mulhouse, Alsace, France

Coordinates: 47°46′13″N 7°19′16″E

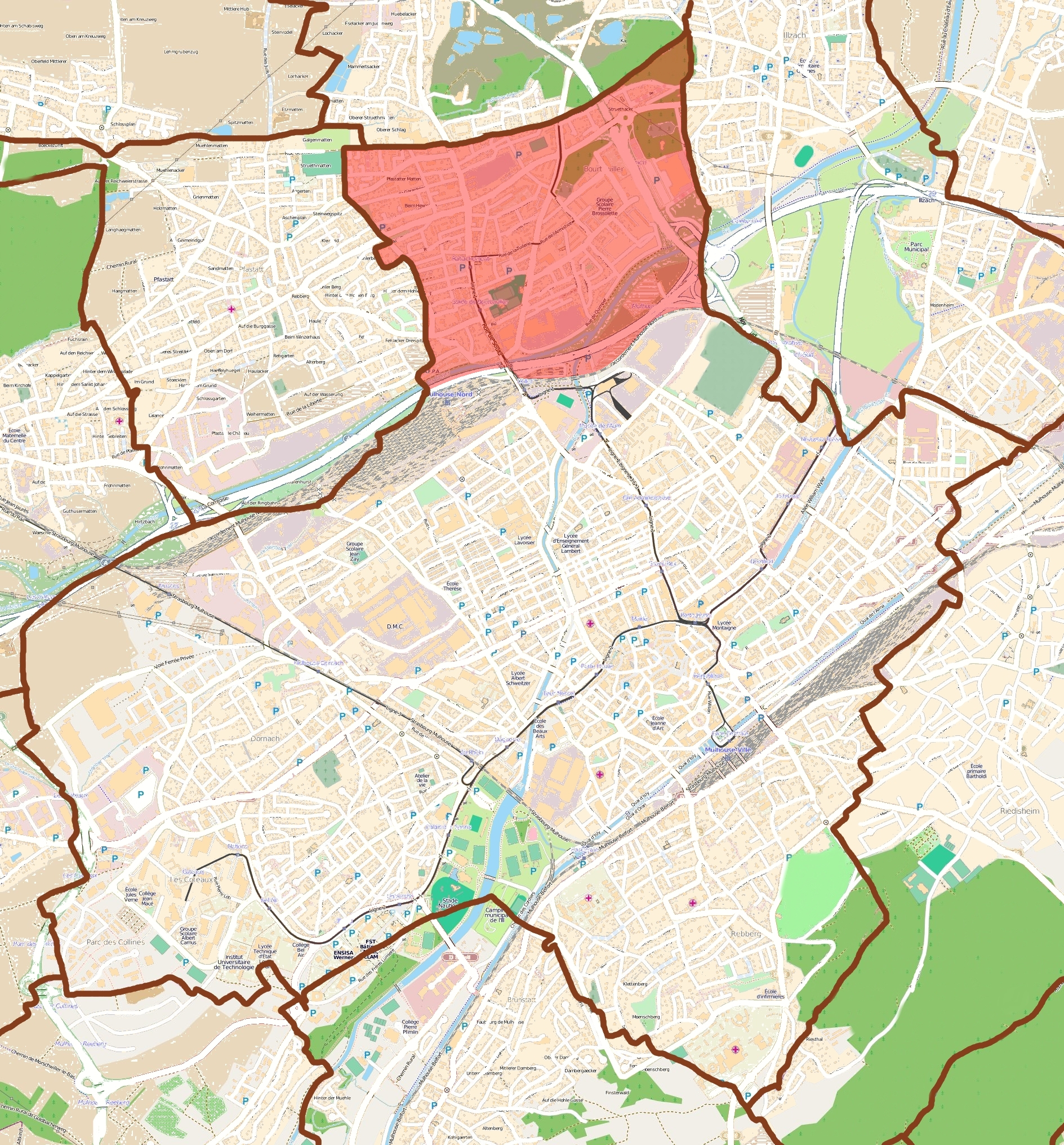
Location of the quarter in the commune of Mulhouse

Bourtzwiller (French pronunciation: [buʁsvilɛʁ]; German: Burzweiler; Alsatian: Burtzwiller) is a neighborhood of Mulhouse, France.

Bourtzwiller is an industrial neighborhood, and has many immigrant families as a result. It is home to a large evangelical Christian church and the largest mosque in Alsace.
