= Leo Baumgratz =

Swiss footballer

Personal information
- Full name: Leo Baumgratz
- Date of birth: unknown
- Place of birth: Switzerland
- Date of death: 1991
- Position: Midfielder

Senior career*
Years	Team	Apps	(Gls)
1948–1951	FC Basel	16	(1)
1951–1958	Concordia Basel		
- * Club domestic league appearances and goals

Leo Baumgratz (who died in 1991) was a Swiss footballer who played as midfielder.

Baumgratz joined FC Basel's first team in their 1948–49 season under player-coach Ernst Hufschmid. After playing in one test match Baumgratz played his domestic league debut for the club in the home game at the Landhof on 27 November 1948 as Basel drew 1–1 with Urania Genève Sport. He scored his first goal for his club four weeks later on 26 December in a Swiss Cup match against Concordia Basel. Basel won 1–0 and, therefore, it was the decisive goal.

A match for Baumgratz to remember was the league match on 29 May 1949 away against La Chaux-de-Fonds. In the 20th minute he scored an own goal and two minutes later he equalised with his first league goal for his club. Basel won the match 4–2 at full time.

Between the years 1948 and 1951 Baumgratz played a total of 25 games for Basel scoring just those two goals. 16 of these games were in the Nationalliga A, three in the Swiss Cup and six were friendly games.

Following his time in Basel Baumgratz moved on to play for Concordia Basel, who at that time played in a lower league.

== Sources ==
- Die ersten 125 Jahre. Publisher: Josef Zindel im Friedrich Reinhardt Verlag, Basel. ISBN 978-3-7245-2305-5
- Verein "Basler Fussballarchiv" Homepage

(NB: Despite all efforts, the editors of these books and the authors in "Basler Fussballarchiv" have failed to be able to identify all the players, their date and place of birth or date and place of death, who played in the games during the early years of FC Basel)
