= Otto Soltermann =

Swiss footballer

Personal information
- Full name: Otto Soltermann
- Place of birth: Switzerland
- Position: Forward

Senior career*
Years	Team	Apps	(Gls)
until 1950	FC Birsfelden		
1949–1950	FC Basel	1	(1)
1950–	FC Birsfelden		
- * Club domestic league appearances and goals

Otto Soltermann was a Swiss footballer who played as a forward.

Soltermann first played for FC Birsfelden and he joined FC Basel's first team for their 1949–50 season. He made his domestic league debut for his new club in the home game at the Landhof on 26 March 1950 against La Chaux-de-Fonds, and scored his first goal in the same game as Basel won 4–3.

In this season Soltermann played six games for Basel scoring that one goal. One of these games was in the Nationalliga A, one was in the Swiss Cup and the other four were friendly games.

Following his time in Basel Soltermann returned to FC Birsfelden.

== Sources ==
- Rotblau: Jahrbuch Saison 2017/2018. Publisher: FC Basel Marketing AG. ISBN 978-3-7245-2189-1
- Die ersten 125 Jahre. Publisher: Josef Zindel im Friedrich Reinhardt Verlag, Basel. ISBN 978-3-7245-2305-5
- Verein "Basler Fussballarchiv" Homepage

(NB: Despite all efforts, the editors of these books and the authors in "Basler Fussballarchiv" have failed to be able to identify all the players, their date and place of birth or date and place of death, who played in the games during the early years of FC Basel)
