= Walter Müller (footballer, born 1920) =

Swiss footballer

Personal information
- Full name: Walter Müller
- Date of birth: 2 January 1920
- Place of birth: Birsfelden, Switzerland
- Date of death: 14 December 2010 (aged 90)
- Place of death: Birsfelden
- Position: Goalkeeper

Youth career
- FC Birsfelden

Senior career*
Years	Team	Apps	(Gls)
until 1942	FC Birsfelden		
1942–1956	FC Basel	249	(0)

International career
1945–1950	Switzerland	0	(0)
- * Club domestic league appearances and goals

Walter Müller (2 January 1920 – 14 December 2010) was a Swiss footballer. He played as a goalkeeper.

== Club football ==
In 1942 Müller moved from his home club FC Birsfelden to FC Basel during their 1942–43 season. His transfer sum (CHF 2500.00) was enormous for its time. Müller played his domestic league debut for his new club in the away game on 5 September 1943 as Basel drew 1–1 with Luzern.

Müller spent fourteen years between the posts for RotBlau, mainly as their first choice goalkeeper, playing in total 380 matches. 249 of these games were in the Swiss Nationalliga and 42 were in the Swiss Cup. The other 89 were friendly games.

His biggest success was the championship title in Basel's 1952–53 season. In addition to this title, Müller also reached the Swiss Cup final twice, one victory and one defeat. At the end of the 1943–44 cup season, on 10 April 1944 in the Wankdorf Stadium in Bern, Basel were defeated in the final by Lausanne Sport through three goals scored in the last five minutes. In Basel's 1946–47 season they won the final 3–0 against the same club. In the Stadion Neufeld on 7 April 1947 Paul Stöcklin scoring all three goals.

== National team ==
Müller never made it to an appearance in the Swiss national football team, however, he was in the squad for more than five years as their substitute goalie.

== Curiosity ==
The that time player-manager of Basel Ernst Hufschmid played his last domestic league match on 23 April 1950 in Espenmoos, St. Gallen, as Basel were defeated by St. Gallen. But in the Basel's 1950–51 season he played one more match, it was his last match as active football player and this he played as goalkeeper. On 10 August 1950 Football Club Basel played against Eishockey Club Basel. This was a return game for the ice hockey game EHC-FCB in December 1949. The football team won the football match 14–5. Because Hufschmid played as goalkeeper Walter Müller played as striker and he scored six goals in this test game.

== Titles and Honours ==
Basel

- Swiss Cup winner: 1946–47
- Swiss League Champion: 1952–53

== See also ==
- List of FC Basel players
- List of FC Basel seasons

== Sources ==
- Rotblau: Jahrbuch Saison 2014/2015. Publisher: FC Basel Marketing AG. ISBN 978-3-7245-2027-6
- Verein "Basler Fussballarchiv" Homepage
- 1946–47 at RSSSF
- 1952–53 at RSSSF
