= Albert Meier =

Swiss footballer

Personal information
- Full name: Albert Meier
- Place of birth: Switzerland
- Position: Forward

Senior career*
Years	Team	Apps	(Gls)
1948–1950	FC Basel	2	(0)
- * Club domestic league appearances and goals

Albert Meier was a Swiss footballer who played for FC Basel at the end of the 1940s. He played as a forward.

Meier joined Basel's first team for their 1949–50 season under player-coach Ernst Hufschmid. Meier made his domestic league debut for the club in the home game at the Landhof on 19 December 1948 as Basel won 1–0 against Bellinzona. Between 1948 and 1950 Meier played two games for Basel without scoring. Both games were in the Nationalliga A.

== Sources ==
- Rotblau: Jahrbuch Saison 2017/2018. Publisher: FC Basel Marketing AG. ISBN 978-3-7245-2189-1
- Die ersten 125 Jahre. Publisher: Josef Zindel im Friedrich Reinhardt Verlag, Basel. ISBN 978-3-7245-2305-5
- Verein "Basler Fussballarchiv" Homepage

(NB: Despite all efforts, the editors of these books and the authors in "Basler Fussballarchiv" have failed to be able to identify all the players, their date and place of birth or date and place of death, who played in the games during the early years of FC Basel)
