= Rudolf Hägler =

Swiss footballer (born 1925)

Personal information
- Full name: Rudolf Hägler
- Date of birth: 24 January 1925
- Place of birth: Switzerland
- Position: Forward

Senior career*
Years	Team	Apps	(Gls)
1947–1949	FC Basel	5	(0)
1949–1952	FC Nordstern Basel	27	(6)
- * Club domestic league appearances and goals

Rudolf Hägler (born 24 January 1925) was a Swiss footballer who played as a forward.

== Biography ==
Hägler joined FC Basel's first team in their 1947–48 season under player-manager Hufschmid. After just one test match, Hägler played his domestic league debut for the club in the away game on 16 November 1947 as Basel played a 3–3 draw against Zürich.

He scored his first goal for his club on 27 December 1947 during the home game at the Landhof against Locarno in the Swiss Cup. It was Basel's fifth goal as Basel won 5–3.

In his two seasons with the team, Hägler played twelve games for Basel and scored twice. Five games were in the Nationalliga A, two in the Swiss Cup and five were friendlies. He scored once in the cup and once in a friendly.

Following his time with FC Basel, Hägler moved on to FC Nordstern Basel where he played for at least three seasons.

== Sources ==
- Rotblau: Jahrbuch Saison 2017/2018. Publisher: FC Basel Marketing AG. ISBN 978-3-7245-2189-1
- Die ersten 125 Jahre. Publisher: Josef Zindel im Friedrich Reinhardt Verlag, Basel. ISBN 978-3-7245-2305-5
- Verein "Basler Fussballarchiv" Homepage
