= Erich Grether =

Swiss footballer (1924-2007)

Personal information
- Full name: Erich Grether
- Date of birth: 27 August 1924
- Place of birth: Switzerland
- Date of death: 16 March 2007 (aged 82)
- Position: Forward

Senior career*
Years	Team	Apps	(Gls)
1947–1951	FC Basel	15	(4)
- * Club domestic league appearances and goals

Erich Grether (27 August 1924 – 16 March 2007) was a Swiss footballer who played for FC Basel. He played mainly as a forward, but also as a midfielder.

Grether joined Basel's first team in their 1947–48 season under player-manager Ernst Hufschmid. After just one test match, Grether played his domestic league debut for the club in the home game at the Landhof on 30 November 1947 as Basel were defeated 0–1 by Lugano. He scored his first Basel goal 22 February 1948 as Basel beat Servette 3–2 at home.

Between 1947 and 1951 Grether played 24 games for Basel scoring seven goals; 15 of the games were in the Nationalliga A and 9 were friendly games. He scored four goals in the domestic league and the other three were scored during the test games.

== Sources ==
- Rotblau: Jahrbuch Saison 2017/2018. Publisher: FC Basel Marketing AG. ISBN 978-3-7245-2189-1
- Die ersten 125 Jahre. Publisher: Josef Zindel im Friedrich Reinhardt Verlag, Basel. ISBN 978-3-7245-2305-5
- Verein "Basler Fussballarchiv" Homepage
