= Jean Presset =

Swiss footballer (1925-2017)

Personal information
- Full name: Jean Presset
- Date of birth: 11 October 1925
- Place of birth: Switzerland
- Date of death: 22 February 2017 (aged 91)
- Place of death: Lausanne, Switzerland
- Position: Goalkeeper

Senior career*
Years	Team	Apps	(Gls)
1944–1947	Lausanne-Sport	16	(0)
1947–1951	FC Basel	4	(0)
1951–1953	Lausanne-Sport	2	(0)
1953–1955	Young Boys	0	(0)
- * Club domestic league appearances and goals

Jean Presset (* 11 October 1925; † 22 February 2017) was a Swiss footballer who played in the 1940s and 1950s as goalkeeper. Even during his active football career he focused on the youth football training of several clubs, these were FC Lausanne-Sport, FC Basel and BSC Young Boys. After his active football he became member of Panathlon International and in 2004 he was rewarded as an honorary member. Jean Presset was known commonly as "Monsieur Fair Play".

== Football career ==
Presset played his early active football with Lausanne-Sport. He advanced to their first team in 1947 and stayed with them for three seasons. He joined FC Basel in 1947 as youth trainer and joined their first team as reserve goalkeeper in their 1947–48 season. He played his domestic league debut for the club in the home game at the Landhof on 9 November 1947 as Basel lost 1–3 against his former club Lausanne. Presset stayed in Basel for four seasons. Between the years 1947 and 1951 Presset played a total of 10 games for Basel. Four of these games were in the Nationalliga A and six were friendly games.

Following his time in Basel, Presset returned to Lausanne for two seasons and then he moved on to BSC Young Boys as reserve goalkeeper and youth trainer.

== Fair play ==
After his active football Presset became member of Panathlon International. From 1978 to 1983 Presset was President of the Panathlon Club of Lausanne. During this period he took part in the launch of the FIFA Fair Play campaign, a program to increase sportsmanship in association football, and in the creation of the Fair Play Charter. He was member of the Fair Play Commission of the Swiss Sport Association. He was also Central Board member of Panathlon International. Later he became Honorary President of the Panathlon Club of Lausanne. In 1984, he was appointed to chair the Panathlon International Scientific and Cultural Commission which he assumed until 1997. He became vice-president of the International Panathlon from 1988 to 1992.

Presset was Founding Member of the International Fair Play Committee and the European Fair Play Movement. On behalf of the IOC, Antonio Samaranch awarded Jean Presset with the Olympic Order. Panathlon International rewarded Presset in 2004 as an honorary member, in recognition of his merits.

== Sources ==
- Die ersten 125 Jahre. Publisher: Josef Zindel im Friedrich Reinhardt Verlag, Basel. ISBN 978-3-7245-2305-5
- Verein "Basler Fussballarchiv" Homepage
- European Fair Play Movement homepage
