= Louis Schenker =

Swiss footballer (born 1917)

Personal information
- Full name: Louis Schenker
- Date of birth: 7 February 1917 (age 109)
- Place of birth: Switzerland
- Positions: Midfielder; striker

Senior career*
Years	Team	Apps	(Gls)
1947–1950	FC Basel	47	(1)
1950–1951	Luzern	8	(0)
- * Club domestic league appearances and goals

Louis Schenker (born 7 February 1917) was a Swiss footballer. He mainly played as a midfielder but also played as a striker.

Schenker joined Basel's first team in their 1947–48 season. After playing in two test games he played his domestic league debut for the club in the home game at the Landhof on 14 March 1948 as Basel won 2–1 against Young Fellows Zürich. He scored his first goal for his club on 8 May 1949 in the away game against Zürich as Basel won 4–2. Schenker's goal was a penalty.

Between the years 1947 and 1950 Schenker played a total of 69 games for Basel scoring one goal, the aforementioned penalty. 47 of these games were in the Nationalliga A, seven in the Swiss Cup and 15 were friendly games.

Following his time in Basel, Schenker joined Luzern who played in the second tier of Swiss football at that time.

== Sources ==
- Rotblau: Jahrbuch Saison 2017/2018. Publisher: FC Basel Marketing AG. ISBN 978-3-7245-2189-1
- Die ersten 125 Jahre. Publisher: Josef Zindel im Friedrich Reinhardt Verlag, Basel. ISBN 978-3-7245-2305-5
- Verein "Basler Fussballarchiv" Homepage

(NB: Despite all efforts, the editors of these books and the authors in "Basler Fussballarchiv" have failed to be able to identify all the players, their date and place of birth or date and place of death, who played in the games during the early years of FC Basel)
