= Bernard Mathez =

Swiss footballer

Personal information
- Full name: Bernard Mathez
- Place of birth: Switzerland
- Position: Forward

Senior career*
Years	Team	Apps	(Gls)
1946–1948	FC Basel	10	(4)
1948–1950	Cantonal Neuchatel	13	(3)
- * Club domestic league appearances and goals

Bernard Mathez was a Swiss footballer who played in the late 1940s as a forward.

Mathez joined Basel's first team during their 1946–47 season under team manager Anton Schall. Mathez played his domestic league debut for the club in the away game on 1 September 1946 as Basel won 2–0 against Locarno. He scored his first goal for his club a week later on 8 September in the home game at the Landhof against Young Boys. In fact he scored two goals as Basel won 8–1.

In his two seasons with the club, Mathez played thirteen games and scored five goals. Ten of these games were in the Nationalliga A, one in the Swiss Cup and two were friendly games. He scored four goals in the domestic league and the other was scored during the test games.

After his time with Basel Mathez moved on and played at least two seasons with Cantonal Neuchatel who at that time played in the Nationalliga B

== Sources ==
- Rotblau: Jahrbuch Saison 2017/2018. Publisher: FC Basel Marketing AG. ISBN 978-3-7245-2189-1
- Die ersten 125 Jahre. Publisher: Josef Zindel im Friedrich Reinhardt Verlag, Basel. ISBN 978-3-7245-2305-5
- Verein "Basler Fussballarchiv" Homepage

(NB: Despite all efforts, the editors of these books and the authors in "Basler Fussballarchiv" have failed to be able to identify all the players, their date and place of birth or date and place of death, who played in the games during the early years of FC Basel)
