= Paul Stöcklin =

Swiss footballer (born 1922)

Personal information
- Full name: Paul Stöcklin
- Date of birth: 29 June 1922
- Date of death: 19 July 2014 (aged 92)
- Position: Striker

Senior career*
Years	Team	Apps	(Gls)
1945–1952	FC Basel	156	(61)
- * Club domestic league appearances and goals

Paul Stöcklin (* 29 June 1922; † 19 July 2017) was a Swiss footballer who played for FC Basel in the 1940s and early 1950s. He played mainly in the position as striker, but also as midfielder.

Stöcklin joined Basel's first team for their 1945–46 season under team manager Max Barras as they played in the Nationalliga B. After playing in two test games and in one Swiss Cup match, Stöcklin played his domestic league debut for the club in the away game on 14 April 1946. He scored his first league goal for his club in the same match as Basel won 2–0 against Luzern. In his very next game, two weeks later, on 28 April Stöcklin scored four goals as Basel beat Fribourg 6–1 in the home match at the Landhof. Basel ended that season with 43 points in 1st position to win the Nationalliga B and win promotion.

During the team's next season (1946–47) Basel advanced to the Swiss Cup-Final, which was played in the Stadion Neufeld in Bern on 7 April 1947. Basel won the final 3–0 against Lausanne-Sport. In the final Stöcklin scored two goals and René Bader the other. Team manager Anton Schall led Basel to win the Cup, but he died shortly afterwards at the age of 40 years during a workout on the football field. Following this unhappy event, team captain Ernst Hufschmid later took over as player-manager.

In the 1946–47 Nationalliga A season Stöcklin was his team's best goal scorer with 11 goals. In the domestic league match on 21 March 1948 away against AC Bellinzona Stöcklin scored a hat-trick as Basel won by five goals to one. Stöcklin played for Basel for seven years. But he missed Basel's first championship title in 1953 for health reasons, in fact he was forced to end his active football career during that year.

Between the years 1945 and 1952 Stöcklin played a total of 238 games for Basel scoring a total of 90 goals. 156 of these games were in the Swiss Serie A, 27 in the Swiss Cup and 55 were friendly games. He scored 61 goals in the domestic league, seven in the cup and the other 22 were scored during the test games.

Subsequently, Stöcklin moved onto training and coaching, primarily to the young players of SC Binningen, where he worked as a youth coach until into the 1980s.

== Sources ==
- Rotblau: Jahrbuch Saison 2017/2018. Publisher: FC Basel Marketing AG. ISBN 978-3-7245-2189-1
- Josef Zindel (2018). FC Basel 1893. Die ersten 125 Jahre (in German). Basel: Friedrich Reinhardt Verlag. ISBN 978-3-7245-2305-5.
- Verein "Basler Fussballarchiv" Homepage
