= 1951–52 BSC Young Boys season =

BSC Young Boys
1951–52 season
- Chairman: Felix Neuenschwander
- Player-coach: Albert Sing
- Stadium: Stadion Wankdorf
- Nationalliga A: 7th
- Swiss Cup: Quarter-finals

The 1951–52 season was the 52n season in the history of Berner Sport Club Young Boys. The team played their home games at Stadion Wankdorf in Bern.

== Players ==
The following is the list of the Young Boys first team squad during their 1951–52 season. The list includes players that were in the squad on the day that the 1951–52 Nationalliga A season started on 26 August 1951 but subsequently left the club after that date.

Note: Flags indicate national team as defined under FIFA eligibility rules; some limited exceptions apply. Players may hold more than one non-FIFA nationality.

No.	Pos.	Nation	Player
—	GK	SUI	Gianfranco de Taddeo
—	GK	SUI	Walter Eich
—	DF	SUI	Hans Flühmann
—	DF	SUI	Otto Häuptli
—	DF	SUI	Peter Rösch
—	DF	SUI	Willi Steffen
—	DF	SUI	Louis Casali
—	DF	SUI	Charles Casali
—	DF	SUI	Marcel Flückiger

No.	Pos.	Nation	Player
—	MF	SUI	Werner Zehnder
—	MF	GER	Albert Sing (Player-coach)
—	MF	SUI	Gottlieb Stäuble (from Basel)
—	MF	SUI	Heinz Bigler
—	FW	SUI	Hans Grütter
—	FW	SUI	Eugen Meier
—	FW	GER	Erich Haag
—	FW	SUI	Albert Stoll

== Competitions ==
Win Draw Loss

=== Overall record ===
Competition	First match	Last match	Starting round	Final position	Record							
Competition	First match	Last match	Starting round	Final position	Pld	W	D	L	GF	GA	GD	Win %
Nationalliga A	26 August 1951	8 June 1952	Matchday 1	7th	26	10	7	9	61	52	+9	38.46
Swiss Cup	4 November 1951	17 February 1952	3rd principal round	Quarter-finals	4	3	0	1	12	6	+6	75.00
Total					30	13	7	10	73	58	+15	43.33

Source: Competitions

=== Nationalliga A ===
==== League table ====
Pos	Team	Pld	W	D	L	GF	GA	GD	Pts
5	La Chaux-de-Fonds	26	11	8	7	62	45	+17	30
6	Servette	26	11	6	9	57	45	+12	28
7	Young Boys	26	10	7	9	61	52	+9	27
8	Lausanne-Sport	26	8	9	9	39	43	−4	25
9	Bellinzona	26	8	6	12	43	55	−12	22

Source: RSSSF

Pos	Team	Pld	W	D	L	GF	GA	GD	Pts	Qualification or relegation
1	FC Fribourg	26	14	8	4	57	34	+23	36	NLB champions and promoted to 1952–53 Nationalliga A
2	FC Grenchen	26	16	3	7	78	40	+38	35	Play-off for promotion
3	SC Zug	26	14	7	5	52	34	+18	35	Play-off for promotion
4	FC Cantonal Neuchâtel	26	15	4	7	72	33	+39	34	
5	ES FC Malley	26	14	2	10	54	49	+5	30	
6	Urania Genève Sport	26	10	6	10	46	46	0	26	
7	Luzern	26	10	5	11	49	52	−3	25	
8	FC Winterthur	26	8	8	10	53	59	−6	24	
9	FC St. Gallen	26	8	7	11	65	51	+14	23	
10	FC Aarau	26	7	8	11	39	62	−23	22	
11	FC Schaffhausen	26	7	7	12	31	56	−25	21	
12	FC Étoile-Sporting	26	7	6	13	30	45	−15	20	
13	FC Mendrisio	26	6	5	15	38	75	−37	17	Relegated to 1952–53 1. Liga
14	FC Nordstern Basel	26	6	4	16	35	63	−28	16	Relegated to 1952–53 1. Liga

Source: RSSSF
Rules for classification: 1) Points; 2) Goal difference within the league, however with play-off for qualifiers;

==== Matches ====
26 August 1951 Round 1	Locarno	1–1	Young Boys	Locarno
				Stadium: Stadio del Lido; Attendance: 2,700; Referee: (Switzerland) Maurice Tasca

2 September 1951 Round 2	Young Boys	2–2	Grasshopper Club Zürich	Bern
				Stadium: Stadion Wankdorf; Attendance: 11,000; Referee: (Switzerland) Jean Lutz

9 September 1951 Round 3	Zürich	1–0	Young Boys	Zürich
				Stadium: Letzigrund; Attendance: 9,000; Referee: (Switzerland) Willy Rufli Bremgarten

23 September 1951 Round 4	Young Boys	3–1	La Chaux-de-Fonds	Bern
				Stadium: Stadion Wankdorf; Attendance: 7,500; Referee: (Switzerland) René Baumberger

30 September 1951 Round 5	Servette	1–2	Young Boys	Geneva
				Stadium: Stade des Charmilles; Attendance: 7,000; Referee: (Switzerland) Paul Raymond Wyssling

7 October 1951 Round 6	Young Fellows Zürich	1–6	Young Boys	Zürich
				Stadium: Letzigrund; Attendance: 4,000; Referee: (Switzerland) Emilio Guidi

21 October 1951 Round 7	Young Boys	3–3	Chiasso	Bern
				Stadium: Stadion Wankdorf; Attendance: 9,000; Referee: (Switzerland) Roger Rapin

28 October 1951 Round 8	Bellinzona	3–0	Young Boys	Bellinzona
				Stadium: Stadio Comunale di Bellinzona; Attendance: 2,300; Referee: (Switzerland) Willy Rufli Bremgarten

11 November 1951 Round 9	Young Boys	4–3	Biel-Bienne	Bern
				Stadium: Stadion Wankdorf; Attendance: 7,500; Referee: (Switzerland) René Baumberger

18 November 1951 Round 10	Basel	3–0	Young Boys	Landhof, Basel
14:30	Hügi (II) 2' (1:0); Hügi (II) 57' (2:0); Bannwart 74' (3:0)	Summary		Attendance: 5,700; Referee: (Switzerland) Ernst Dörflinger Grenchen

2 December 1951 Round 11	Young Boys	2–1	Lausanne-Sport	Bern
				Stadium: Stadion Wankdorf; Attendance: 8,000; Referee: (Switzerland) Louis Tschopp

9 December 1951 Round 12	Young Boys	3–4	FC Bern	Bern
				Stadium: Stadion Wankdorf; Attendance: 11,000; Referee: (Switzerland) Willy Rufli Bremgarten

16 December 1951 Round 13	Young Boys	1–1	Lugano	Bern
				Stadium: Stadion Wankdorf; Attendance: 6,500; Referee: (Switzerland) Josef Gulde

24 February 1952 Round 14	Young Boys	8–2	Locarno	Bern
				Stadium: Stadion Wankdorf; Attendance: 4,000; Referee: (Switzerland) Maurice Tasca

2 March 1952 Round 15	Grasshopper Club Zürich	4–1	Young Boys	Zürich
				Stadium: Hardturm; Attendance: 8,000; Referee: (Switzerland) Willy Rufli Bremgarten

9 March 1952 Round 16	Young Boys	2–0	Zürich	Bern
				Stadium: Stadion Wankdorf; Attendance: 7,000; Referee: (Switzerland) Julien Stoudmann

30 March 1952 Round 18	Young Boys	1–2	Servette	Bern
				Stadium: Stadion Wankdorf; Attendance: 7,000; Referee: (Switzerland) Armand Merlotti

6 April 1952 Round 19	Young Boys	2–2	Young Fellows Zürich	Bern
				Stadium: Stadion Wankdorf; Attendance: 7,500; Referee: (Switzerland) René Baumberger

20 April 1952 Round 20	Chiasso	1–0	Young Boys	Chiasso
				Stadium: Campo di via Brodega; Attendance: 2,000; Referee: (Switzerland) Maurice Tasca

27 April 1952 Round 21	Young Boys	2–1	Bellinzona	Bern
				Stadium: Stadion Wankdorf; Attendance: 6,000; Referee: (Switzerland) Adrien Mouche

4 May 1952 Round 22	Biel-Bienne	4–2	Young Boys	Biel/Bienne
				Stadium: Stadion Gurzelen; Attendance: 2,500; Referee: (Switzerland) Roger Rapin

11 May 1952 Round 23	Young Boys	4–3	Basel	Neufeld, Bern
15:00	Sing 6' (1:0); Häuptli 14' (2:0); Zaugg 24' (3:0); Meier 52' (4:0)	Summary	54' (4:1) Thalmann; 60' (pen. 4:2) Bader; 64' (4:3) Suter	Attendance: 5,000; Referee: (Switzerland) Louis Tschopp Delémont

18 May 1952 Round 24	Lausanne-Sport	2–1	Young Boys	Lausanne
				Stadium: Olympique de la Pontaise; Attendance: 3,500; Referee: (Switzerland) Fritz Buchmüller

22 May 1952 Round 17	La Chaux-de-Fonds	1–1	Young Boys	La Chaux-de-Fonds
				Stadium: Stade de la Charrière; Attendance: 2,200; Referee: (Switzerland) Edmund Bertsche

25 May 1952 Round 25	FC Bern	1–6	Young Boys	Bern
				Stadium: Stadion Neufeld; Attendance: 8,000; Referee: (Switzerland) Paul Raymond Wyssling

8 June 1952 Round 26	Lugano	4–4	Young Boys	Lugano
				Stadium: Cornaredo Stadium; Attendance: 500; Referee: (Switzerland) Josef Gulde

=== Swiss Cup ===
4 November 1951 3rd principal round	SC Derendingen	0–3	Young Boys

23 December 1951 Round of 32	SR Delémont	1–3	Young Boys

6 January 1952 Round of 16	Young Boys	4–1	Lausanne-Sport	Bern
				Stadium: Stadion Wankdorf

17 February 1952 Quarter-finals	CS International GE	4–2	Young Boys
