= 1950–51 BSC Young Boys season =

BSC Young Boys
1950–51 season
- Chairman: Felix Neuenschwander
- Manager: Eric Jones; Albert Sing
- Stadium: Stadion Wankdorf
- Nationalliga A: 7th
- Swiss Cup: Round of 16
- Biggest win: Young Boys 9–0 FC Bodio
- Biggest defeat: Chiasso 5–0 Young Boys

The 1950–51 season was the 51st season in the history of Berner Sport Club Young Boys. The team played their home games at Stadion Wankdorf or at Stadion Neufeld, both in Bern.

== Players ==
The following is the list of the Young Boys first team squad during their 1950–51 season. The list includes players that were in the squad on the day that the 1950–51 Nationalliga A season started on 3 September 1950 but subsequently left the club after that date.

Note: Flags indicate national team as defined under FIFA eligibility rules; some limited exceptions apply. Players may hold more than one non-FIFA nationality.

No.	Pos.	Nation	Player
—	GK	SUI	Gianfranco de Taddeo (from La Chaux-de-Fonds)
—	GK	SUI	Walter Eich
—	DF	SUI	Charles Casali
—	DF	SUI	Louis Casali
—	DF	SUI	Hans Flühmann
—	DF	SUI	Marcel Flückiger
—	DF	SUI	Otto Häuptli (from Aarau)
—	MF	SUI	Heinz Bigler (from Thun)
—	MF	SUI	Willy Hochstrasser

No.	Pos.	Nation	Player
—	MF/FW	SUI	Albert Stoll
—	MF	SUI	Robert Weil
—	MF	SUI	Werner Zehnder
—	FW	SUI	Walter Beerli
—	FW	SUI	Hans Grütter
—	FW	ENG	Eric Jones (player-coach)
—	FW	SUI	Hans Thommen
—			Michel Peney
—			Ernst Giacometti

== Friendlies ==
Win Draw Loss

19 August 1950 Friendly	Zürich (Switzerland)	0–0	(Switzerland) Young Boys	Zürich
				Stadium: Letzigrund; Attendance: 2,000; Referee: G. Kohli

== Competitions ==
=== Overall record ===
Competition	First match	Last match	Starting round	Final position	Record							
Competition	First match	Last match	Starting round	Final position	Pld	W	D	L	GF	GA	GD	Win %
Nationalliga A	3 September 1950	17 June 1951	Matchday 1	12th	26	11	5	10	53	55	−2	42.31
Swiss Cup	29 October 1950	7 January 1951	3rd principal round	Round of 16	3	2	0	1	12	5	+7	66.67
Total					29	13	5	11	65	60	+5	44.83

Source: Competitions

=== Nationalliga A ===
==== League table ====
Pos	Team	Pld	W	D	L	GF	GA	GD	Pts	Qualification
1	Lausanne-Sport	26	14	6	6	58	31	+27	34	Swiss Champions
2	Chiasso	26	12	7	7	60	52	+8	31	
3	La Chaux-de-Fonds	26	11	8	7	72	64	+8	30	Swiss Cup winners
4	Basel	26	12	4	10	62	51	+11	28	
5	Zürich	26	13	2	11	65	62	+3	28	
6	Servette	26	11	6	9	46	43	+3	28	
7	Young Boys	26	11	5	10	53	55	−2	27	
8	Lugano	26	9	8	9	33	42	−9	26	
9	Bellinzona	26	10	5	11	36	45	−9	25	
10	Young Fellows Zürich	26	9	6	11	55	58	−3	24	
11	Biel-Bienne	26	8	7	11	45	41	+4	23	
12	Locarno	26	8	6	12	40	43	−3	22	Play-off winners, remain in Nationalliga A
13	Grenchen	26	8	6	12	31	47	−16	22	Play-off losers, relegated to Nationalliga B
14	Cantonal Neuchatel	26	4	8	14	41	63	−22	16	Relegated

Source: rsssf.com

==== Matches ====
3 September 1950 Round 1	Young Boys	2–2	Locarno	Bern
				Stadium: Stadion Wankdorf; Attendance: 6,500; Referee: (Switzerland) Paul Raymond Wyssling

9 September 1950 Round 2	Basel	5–1	Young Boys	Stadion Schützenmatte, Basel
15:00	Hügi (II) 31' (1:1); 40' (o.g. 2:1); Stäuble 62' (3:1); Bannwart 64' (4:1); 72' (o.g. 5:1)	Summary	30' (0:1) Beerli	Attendance: 5,500; Referee: (Switzerland) Lutz Geneva

24 September 1950 Round 3	Young Boys	2–1	Grenchen	Bern
				Stadium: Stadion Wankdorf; Attendance: 7,000; Referee: (Switzerland) Emilio Guidi

1 October 1950 Round 4	Lausanne-Sport	1–2	Young Boys	Lausanne
				Stadium: Stade de la Pontaise; Attendance: 5,000; Referee: (Switzerland) Hans Vogt

8 October 1950 Round 5	Young Boys	4–5	Young Fellows Zürich	Bern
				Stadium: Stadion Wankdorf; Attendance: 7,500; Referee: (Switzerland) Maurice Tasca

22 October 1950 Round 6	Chiasso	5–0	Young Boys	Chiasso
				Stadium: Campo di via Brodega; Attendance: 2,500; Referee: (Switzerland) Roger Rapin

5 November 1950 Round 7	Young Boys	1–0	Bellinzona	Bern
				Stadium: Stadion Wankdorf; Attendance: 6,000; Referee: (Switzerland) Louis Tschopp

19 November 1950 Round 8	Biel-Bienne	0–2	Young Boys	Biel/Bienne
				Stadium: Stadion Gurzelen; Attendance: 6,500; Referee: (Switzerland) Jean Lutz

26 November 1950 Round 9	Young Boys	7–2	Cantonal Neuchâtel	Bern
				Stadium: Stadion Wankdorf; Attendance: 3,000; Referee: (Switzerland) Julien Stoudmann

10 December 1950 Round 10	Young Boys	3–0	Servette	Bern
				Stadium: Stadion Wankdorf; Attendance: 11,000; Referee: (Switzerland) René Baumberger

17 December 1950 Round 11	La Chaux-de-Fonds	1–1	Young Boys	La Chaux-de-Fonds
				Stadium: Stade de la Charrière; Attendance: 2,300; Referee: (Switzerland) Leopold Schmidsberger

24 December 1950 Round 12	Young Boys	1–3	Zürich	Bern
	Beerli 25'		Walter Schneiter 75'; Gottfried Kohler 82', 85'	Stadium: Stadion Wankdorf; Attendance: 5,500; Referee: (Switzerland) Roger Rapin

31 December 1950 Round 13	Lugano	1–0	Young Boys	Lugano
	Adriano Kauer 26'			Stadium: Campo Marzio; Attendance: 4,000; Referee: (Switzerland) Louis Tschopp

11 March 1951 Round 15	Young Boys	3–6	Basel	Wankdorf Stadium, Bern
14:30	Thommen 5' (1:0); Beerli 13' (2:0); Beerli 59' (3:4)	Summary	17' (2:1) Hügi (II); 22' (2:2) Hügi (II); 32' (2:3) Hügi (II); 50' (2:4) Hügi (II); 79' (3:5) Stäuble (3:6) Hügi (II)	Attendance: 8,000; Referee: (Switzerland) Lutz Geneva

1 April 1951 Round 17	Young Boys	0–2	Lausanne-Sport	Bern
				Stadium: Stadion Wankdorf; Attendance: 10,000; Referee: (Switzerland) Emilio Guidi

8 April 1951 Round 18	Young Fellows Zürich	2–3	Young Boys	Zürich
				Stadium: Letzigrund; Attendance: 10,000; Referee: (Switzerland) Ernst Dörflinger

22 April 1951 Round 19	Young Boys	3–3	Chiasso	Bern
				Stadium: Stadion Wankdorf; Attendance: 9,000; Referee: (Switzerland) René Baumberger

3 May 1951 Round 16	Grenchen	0–4	Young Boys	Grenchen
				Stadium: Stadion Brühl; Attendance: 4,000; Referee: (Switzerland) Willy Rufli

6 May 1951 Round 21	Young Boys	2–2	Biel-Bienne	Bern
				Stadium: Stadion Wankdorf; Attendance: 8,000; Referee: (Switzerland) Armand Merlotti

13 May 1951 Round 14	Locarno	0–3	Young Boys	Locarno
				Stadium: Stadio del Lido; Attendance: 2,800; Referee: (Switzerland) Louis Tschopp

20 May 1951 Round 22	Cantonal Neuchâtel	0–0	Young Boys	Neuchâtel
				Stadium: Stade de la Maladière; Attendance: 5,300; Referee: (Switzerland) Paul Raymond Wyssling

24 May 1951 Round 20	Bellinzona	3–0	Young Boys	Bellinzona
				Stadium: Stadio Comunale di Bellinzona; Attendance: 2,000; Referee: (Switzerland) Maurice Tasca

27 May 1951 Round 23	Servette	2–1	Young Boys	Geneva
				Stadium: Stade des Charmilles; Attendance: 2,500; Referee: (Switzerland) Roger Rapin

3 June 1951 Round 24	Young Boys	4–3	La Chaux-de-Fonds	Bern
				Stadium: Stadion Wankdorf; Attendance: 8,000; Referee: (Switzerland) Edmund Bertsche

10 June 1951 Round 25	Zürich	5–2	Young Boys	Zürich
				Stadium: Letzigrund; Attendance: 5,500; Referee: (Switzerland) Roger Rapin

17 June 1951 Round 26	Young Boys	2–1	Lugano	Bern
				Stadium: Stadion Wankdorf; Attendance: 4,000; Referee: (Switzerland) Maurice Tasca

=== Swiss Cup ===
29 October 1950 3rd principal round	FC Solothurn	1–2	Young Boys	Solothurn
				Stadium: Stadion FC Solothurn

3 December 1950 Round of 32	Young Boys	9–0	FC Bodio	Bern
				Stadium: Stadion Wankdorf

7 January 1951 Round of 16	Lausanne-Sport	4–1	Young Boys	Lausanne
				Stadium: Stade de la Pontaise
