= 1954–55 FC Basel season =

FC Basel
1954–55 season
- Chairman: Jules Düblin
- Manager: René Bader with Willy Dürr
- Ground: Landhof, Basel
- Top goalscorer: League: Josef Hügi (20); All: Josef Hügi (23)
- Highest home attendance: 11,000 on 17 April 1955 vs Grasshopper Club and on 22 May 1955 vs La Chaux-de-Fonds
- Lowest home attendance: 4,500 on 5 September 1954 vs Bellinzona and on 6 March 1955 vs Chiasso
- Average home league attendance: 6,476

The 1954–55 season was Fussball Club Basel 1893's 61st season in their existence. It was their ninth consecutive season in the top flight of Swiss football after their promotion from the Nationalliga B the season 1945–46. They played their home games in the Landhof, in the Wettstein Quarter in Kleinbasel. Jules Düblin was the club's chairman. It was his ninth successive season as chairman.

== Overview ==
René Bader continued as the team's player-coach, for the third consecutive season with Willy Dürr as his assistant. However, in this season Bader only played in one test match. Basel played a total of 43 games during their 1954–55 season. Of these 43 matches 26 were in the domestic league, three matches were in the Swiss Cup and 14 were test or friendly matches. The test/friendly games resulted with five victories, two were drawn and seven matches ended with a defeat. In total, including the test games and the cup competition, 17 games were won, six were drawn and 20 were lost. In their 41 games they scored 101 goals and conceded 98.

There were fourteen teams contesting in the 1954–55 Nationalliga A, the last two teams in the table were to be relegated. Basel won 10 of their 26 games and drew four times and lost 12 times. They scored 47 goals and conceded 52. Basel ended the championship with 24 points in 9th position. They were 18 points behind La Chaux-de-Fonds who won the Swiss Championship for the second time in a row. Thun and Luzern suffered relegation. Josef Hügi was Basel's top league goal scorer with 20 goals and he was third top goal scorer in the league behind Marcel Mauron from La Chaux-de-Fonds who had scored 30 times. Bannwart was Basel's second best goal scorer with eight goals. Further, Hansueli Oberer scored five and Juan Monros netted four times.

Basel joined the Swiss Cup in the third principal round. They were drawn away against lower tier local team FC Riehen, but the match was played at the Landhof and Basel won 6–0. In the fourth round they were drawn at home to lower tier FC Olten and Basel won 2–0. In the fifth round Basel were drawn at home to Zürich. But here they were knocked out of the competition

== Players ==
The following is the list of the Basel first team squad during the season 1954–55. The list includes players that were in the squad on the day that the Nationalliga A season started on 29 August 1954 but subsequently left the club after that date.

Note: Flags indicate national team as defined under FIFA eligibility rules; some limited exceptions apply. Players may hold more than one non-FIFA nationality.

No.	Pos.	Nation	Player
—	GK	SUI	Walter Müller
—	GK	SUI	Werner Schley (from Grasshopper Club)
—	DF	SUI	Werner Bopp
—	DF	SUI	Hans-Rudolf Fitze
—	DF	SUI	Hans Hügi (I)
—	DF	SUI	René Klauser (I)
—	DF	HUN	György Mogoy
—	DF	SUI	Hans Weber
—	MF	SUI	Eugen Büchel (from Young Fellows Zürich)
—	MF	SUI	Raymond Gilliéron (from Brühl St. Gallen)
—	MF	SUI	Albert Haug (from Zürich)
—	MF	SUI	Luciano Merlini (from Locarno)

No.	Pos.	Nation	Player
—	MF	ESP	Juan Monros
—	MF	FRA	Pierre Redolfi
—	MF	SUI	Kurt Thalmann
—	FW	SUI	René Bader (Player-coach)
—	FW	SUI	Walter Bannwart
—	FW	SUI	Josef Hügi (II)
—	FW	SUI	Rolf Keller
—	FW	SUI	Ernst Klauser (II)
—	FW	SUI	Hansueli Oberer (from FC Olten)
—	FW	SUI	Hans-Peter Schär
—	FW	ITA	Romano Zolin
—		SUI	Alfred Hartmann
—		SUI	Hans Jordi

Players who left the squad

Note: Flags indicate national team as defined under FIFA eligibility rules; some limited exceptions apply. Players may hold more than one non-FIFA nationality.

No.	Pos.	Nation	Player
—	GK	SUI	Gianfranco de Taddeo (to Cantonal Neuchatel)
—	GK	FRA	Simon Gusothien (to FC Hégenheim)
—	MF	SUI	Walter Felber

No.	Pos.	Nation	Player
—	MF	SUI	Benedikt Frey (to CIBA)
—	MF	SUI	Kurt Maurer (to La Chaux-de-Fonds)
—	FW	SUI	Walter Bielser (to Biel-Bienne)

== Results ==
Legend

Win Draw Loss Postponed

=== Friendly matches ===
==== Pre-season and mid-season ====
July 1954 Pre-season	Basel (Switzerland)	9–1	(Switzerland) FC Birsfelden	Basel
	Goal	Summary	Goal	Referee: (Switzerland)

1 August 1954 Pre-season	Biel-Bienne (Switzerland)	3–8	(Switzerland) Basel	Sport ground, Gerlafingen
	Wolfisberg (1x); Lipps (1x); Scheurer (1x)	Summary	(4x) Hügi (II) (2x) Oberer (1x) Klauser (II) (o.g.)	Attendance: 1,000; Referee: (Switzerland) Hämisegger Gerlafingen

8 August 1954 Pre-season	Stade Français (France)	2–1	(Switzerland) Basel	Paris
	Bopp 15' (o.g. 1:0); Raymond 81' (2:0)	Summary	(2:1) Hügi (II)

14 August 1954 Pre-season	Basel (Switzerland)	1–3	(Germany) SV Werder Bremen	Landhof, Basel
17:30	Weber (0:3)	Summary	25' (0:1) Hase; 56' (pen. 0:2) Heyse; 57' (0:3) Preise	Attendance: 1,100; Referee: (Switzerland) Weiersmüller Suhr
Note: Game abandoned due to unplayable terrain (thunderstorm).

21 August 1954 Pre-season	Basel (Switzerland)	2–2	Austria Wien	Landhof, Basel
17:30	Hügi (II) 58' (1:2); Hügi (II) 68' (2:2)	Summary	1' (0:1) Sabetzer; 34' (0:2) Schleger	Attendance: 850; Referee: (Switzerland) Basel

22 August 1954 Pre-season	Grasshopper Club (Switzerland)	0–2	(Switzerland) Basel	Espenmoos, St. Gallen
16:15	Vukosavljević (penalty missed)	Summary	19' (0:1) Maurer; 54' (o.g. 0:2) Vetsch	Referee: (Switzerland) Josef Gulde St. Gallen

14 September 1954 Mid-season	Zagreb XI (Croatia)	6–3	(Switzerland) Basel	Stadion Maksimir, Zagreb
	Medved 8' (1:0); Liposinovic 30' (2:1); Liposinovic 32' (3:1); Medved 40' (4:1); Osojnjak 61' (5:1); Osojnjak 88' (6:3)	Summary	17' (pen. 1:1) Casali; 80' (5:2) Hügi (II); 81' (pen. 5:3) Casali	Attendance: 5,000

==== Winter break to end of season ====
30 January 1955 Winter break	Basel (Switzerland)	1–2	(Switzerland) Nordstern Basel	Landhof, Basel
14:30	Bannwart 34' (1:1)	Summary	4' (0:1) Kirchhofer; 63' (1:2) Zingg	Attendance: 3,500; Referee: (Switzerland) Gottfried Dienst Basel

14 February 1955 Winter break	Biel-Bienne (Switzerland)	7–4	(Switzerland) Basel	Gurzelen Stadion, Biel/Bienne
	Bielser 10' (1:1); Kohler 16' (2:1); Kohler 52' (3:3); Kohler 70' (4:3); Kohler 71' (5:3); Bielser 80' (pen. 6:3); Riederer 85' (7:3)	Summary	8' (0:1) Keller; 24' (2:2) Jordi; 34' (2:3) Weber; 88' (7:4) Bannwart	Attendance: 1,200; Referee: (Switzerland) W. Caccivio Biel/Bienne

17 February 1955 Winter break	FC Liestal (Switzerland)	1–7	(Switzerland) Basel	Gitterli, Liestal
		Summary	(4x) Schär (2x) Keller (1x) Bannwart

30 April 1955 Mid-season	Basel (Switzerland)	0–8	(Croatia) Zagreb XI	Landhof, Basel
17:30		Summary	24' (1:0) Medved; 32' (0:2) Caijkovski; 40' (0:3) Benko; 43' (0:4) Benko (0:2) Liposinovic (0:6) Medved (0:7) Dvornic (0:8) Caijkovski	Attendance: 6,500; Referee: (Switzerland) W. Müller Baden

26 May 1955 Mid-season	Basel (Switzerland)	3–1	(Brazil) Associação Atlética Portuguesa	Landhof, Basel
18:30	Oberer 8' (1:0); Hügi (II) 27' (2:0); Hügi (II) 61' (3:0)	Summary	82' (3:1) Miltinho	Attendance: 7,00; Referee: (Switzerland) Zutter Bern

18 June 1955 Mid-season	Basel (Switzerland)	2–4	(Brazil) Fluminense	Landhof, Basel
17:30	Oberer 13' (pen. 1:1); Monros 18' (2:1)	Summary	1' (1:0) Waldo; 27' (pen. 2:2) Pinheiro; 30' (2:3) Waldo; 31' (2:4) Carlos	Attendance: 7,000; Referee: (Switzerland) Gottfried Dienst Basel

30 June 1955 End of season	Basel (Switzerland)	2–2	(Germany) Hamburger SV	Landhof, Basel
18:30	Monros 11' (1:0); Hügi (II) 65' (2:1)	Summary	51' (1:1) Stürmer; 71' (2:2) Schild	Attendance: 6,500; Referee: (Switzerland) J. Heymann Arlesheim

=== Nationalliga A ===
==== League matches ====
29 August 1954 Round 1	Basel	0–3	Zürich	Landhof, Basel
15:00		Summary	72' (0:1) Bruppacher; 73' (0:2) Vidjak; 77' (0:3) Vidjak	Attendance: 5,000; Referee: (Switzerland) Victor Werner Schicker Bern

5 September 1954 Round 2	Basel	1–1	Bellinzona	Landhof, Basel
15:00	Hügi (II) 52' (1:1)	Summary	27' (0:1) Sartori	Attendance: 4,500; Referee: (Switzerland) von Gunten Bern

12 September 1954 Round 3	Chiasso	3–1	Basel	Stadio Via Comacini, Chiasso
	Chiesa 40' (1:0); Riva 52' (2:0); Riva 87' (3:1)	Summary	(2:1) Oberer	Attendance: 1,200; Referee: (Switzerland) Weiersmüller Suhr

26 September 1954 Round 4	Basel	3–1	Luzern	Landhof, Basel
15:00	Bannwart 15' (1:0); Bannwart 25' (2:0); Bannwart 77' (3:1)	Summary	28' (2:1) Kyd	Attendance: 5,000; Referee: (Switzerland) W. Rufli Bremgarten

3 October 1954 Round 5	Thun	2–1	Basel	Stadion Lachen, Thun
	Czischeck 54' (1:1); Czischeck 64' (2:1)	Summary	15' (0:1) Hügi (II); (penalty missed) Mogoy	Attendance: 5,000; Referee: (Switzerland) F. Buchmüller Zürich

17 October 1954 Round 6	Basel	3–2	Servette	Landhof, Basel
15:00	Weber 5' (1:0); Hügi (II) (2:1); Hügi (II) 72' (3:2)	Summary	30' (1:1) Friedländer; 67' (2:2) Epp	Attendance: 8,000; Referee: (Switzerland) Zutter Bern

24 October 1954 Round 7	Grasshopper Club	3–1	Basel	Hardturm, Zürich
15:00	Hagen 20' (pen. 1:0); Moser 28' (2:0); Vonlanthen (II) 48' (3:1)	Summary	33' (pen. 2:1) Hügi (II)	Attendance: 12,000; Referee: (Switzerland) Fr. Karlen Bern

31 October 1954 Round 8	Basel	3–1	Grenchen	Landhof, Basel
15:00	Hügi (II) 53' (1:0); Bannwart 56' (2:0); Hügi (II) 88' (3:1)	Summary	73' (2:1) Raboud	Attendance: 6,000; Referee: (Switzerland) F. Schorer Interlaken

14 November 1954 Round 9	Lugano	2–3	Basel	Cornaredo, Lugano
	Poma 71' (1:3); Stefanina 76' (2:3)	Summary	18' (0:1) Keller; 23' (0:2) Bannwart; 51' (0:3) Hügi (II)	Attendance: 2,000; Referee: (Switzerland) W. Müller Baden

21 November 1954 Round 10	Basel	2–0	Fribourg	Landhof, Basel
14:30	Zolin 75' (1:0); Keller 76' (2:0)	Summary		Attendance: 5,000; Referee: (Switzerland) Rapin Lausanne

27 November 1954 Round 11	La Chaux-de-Fonds	4–1	Basel	Stade Charrière, La Chaux-de-Fonds
14:30	Mauron 38' (1:0); Colombino 40' (2:0); Mauron 52' (3:0); Antenen 68' (4:1); Zappella (yellow card)	Summary	62' (3:1) Zolin	Attendance: 5,000; Referee: (Switzerland) W. Rufli Bremgarten

12 December 1954 Round 12	Basel	1–1	Young Boys	Landhof, Basel
14:30	Hügi (II) 55' (1:1)	Summary	31' (pen. 0:1) Grütter	Attendance: 7,000; Referee: (Switzerland) Merlotti Neuchâtel

19 December 1954 Round 13	Lausanne-Sport	1–1	Basel	Olympique de la Pontaise, Lausanne
	Guhl 70' (1:1)	Summary	24' (0:1) Keller	Attendance: 4,000; Referee: (Switzerland) Dörflinger Grenchen

December 1954 Round 14	Zürich	P – P	Basel	Letzigrund, Zürich
		[ Summary]

27 February 1955 Round 15	Bellinzona	1–0	Basel	Stadio Comunale, Bellinzona
	Sartori 60' (1:0)	Summary		Attendance: 1,500; Referee: (Switzerland) von Gunten Bern

6 March 1955 Round 16	Basel	0–2	Chiasso	Landhof, Basel
16:00		Summary	85' (pen. 0:1) Oberer (0:2) Frigerio	Attendance: 4,500; Referee: (Switzerland) Schüttel Sion

13 March 1955 Round 17	Luzern	2–1	Basel	Stadion Allmend, Luzern
	Künzli 19' (1:0); Kyd 60' (2:1)	Summary	(1:1) Thalmann	Attendance: 3,500; Referee: (Switzerland) W. Rufli Bremgarten

20 March 1955 Round 14	Zürich	3–1	Basel	Letzigrund, Zürich
15:00	Fottner 43' (1:0); Battistella 49' (2:0); Feller 50' (3:0)	Summary	60' (3:1) Hügi (II)	Attendance: 4,000; Referee: (Switzerland) von Gunten BernL

27 March 1955 Round 18	Basel	3–2	Thun	Landhof, Basel
15:00	Hügi (II) (penalty missed) 21′ Hügi (II) 21' (1:0); Bannwart 55' (2:1); Hügi (II) 68' (3:1)	Summary	48' (1:1) Czischeck; 73' (pen. 3:2) Czischeck	Attendance: 5,600; Referee: (Switzerland) F. Buchmüller Zürich

3 April 1955 Round 19	Servette	2–2	Basel	Charmilles Stadium, Geneva
15:00	Pastega 57' (1:1); Pasteur 60' (2:1)	Summary	24' (0:1) Oberer; 62' (2:2) Hügi (II)	Attendance: 6,000; Referee: (Switzerland) Paul Wyssling Zürich

17 April 1955 Round 20	Basel	3–2	Grasshopper Club	Landhof, Basel
15:00	Oberer 15' (1:0); Monros 33' (2:1); Monros (3:1)	Summary	26' (1:1) Moser; 77' (3:2) Hagen	Attendance: 11,000; Referee: (Switzerland) F. Schorer Interlaken

24 April 1954 Round 21	Grenchen	3–1	Basel	Stadion Brühl, Grenchen
15:00	Jeanneret 6' (1:0); Sidler 46' (pen. 2:1); Mäder 74' (3:1)	Summary	19' (1:1) Monros	Attendance: 2,500; Referee: (Switzerland) Victor Werner Schicker Bern

8 May 1955 Round 22	Basel	4–1	Lugano	Landhof, Basel
15:00	10' (o.g. 1:0); Thalmann 20' (2:0); Oberer 27' (3:1); Hügi (II) 32' (4:1)	Summary	26' (o.g. 2:1)	Attendance: 5,600; Referee: (Switzerland) D. Mellet Lausanne

15 May 1955 Round 23	Fribourg	3–1	Basel	Saint-Léonard, Freiburg
	Edenhofer 47' (1:0); Kaeslin 56' (2:0); Edenhofer 82' (3:0)	Summary	87' (3:1) Hügi (II)	Attendance: 2,600; Referee: (Switzerland) Surdez Delémont

22 May 1955 Round 24	Basel	4–3	La Chaux-de-Fonds	Landhof, Basel
15:00	Hügi (II) 11' (pen. 1:1); Oberer 18' (2:1); Bannwart 38' (3:1); Hügi (II) 41' (4:2)	Summary	6' (0:1) Mauron; 31' (2:2) Mauron; 58' (o.g. 4:3) Bopp	Attendance: 11,000; Referee: (Switzerland) Victor Werner Schicker Bern

30 May 1955 Round 25	Young Boys	2–1	Basel	Wankdorf Stadium, Bern
15:00	Hamel 26' (1:1); Häuptli 56' (2:1)	Summary	25' (0:1) Hügi (II)	Attendance: 8,000; Referee: (Switzerland) Weiersmüller Suhr

12 June 1955 Round 26	Basel	5–2	Lausanne-Sport	Landhof, Basel
15:00	Hügi (II) 4' (1:1); Hügi (II) 37' (2:1); Monros 75' (3:2); Bannwart 79' (4:2); Thalmann 89' (5:2)	[ Summary]	3' (0:1) Appel; 60' (2:2) Vonlanthen	Attendance: 6,000; Referee: (Switzerland) von Gunten Bern

==== League table ====
Pos	Team	Pld	W	D	L	GF	GA	GD	Pts	Qualification
1	La Chaux-de-Fonds	26	19	4	3	99	46	+53	42	Champions and Swiss Cup winners
2	Lausanne-Sport	26	16	6	4	75	35	+40	38	
3	Grasshopper Club	26	14	5	7	80	43	+37	33	
4	Zürich	26	13	4	9	52	48	+4	30	
5	Young Boys	26	10	8	8	65	53	+12	28	
6	Servette	26	11	4	11	54	53	+1	26	
7	Bellinzona	26	8	10	8	28	29	−1	26	
8	Chiasso	26	10	5	11	48	58	−10	25	
9	Basel	26	10	4	12	47	52	−5	24	
10	Fribourg	26	9	3	14	40	61	−21	21	
11	Lugano	26	8	4	14	47	79	−32	20	
12	Grenchen	26	7	5	14	35	48	−13	19	
13	Thun	26	6	6	14	35	65	−30	18	Relegated
14	Luzern	26	6	2	18	38	73	−35	14	Relegated

Source: rsssf.com

=== Swiss Cup ===
7 November 1954 Round 3	Basel	6–0	FC Riehen	Landhof, Basel
12:30	Hügi (II) 5' (1:0); Fitze 23' (2:0); 30' (o.g. 3:0); Keller 32' (4:0); Bannwart 33' (5:0); Keller 62' (6:0)	Summary		Attendance: 3,000; Referee: (Switzerland) Frieden Bern

5 December 1954 Round 4	Basel	2–0	FC Olten	Landhof, Basel
14:30	Hügi (II) 17' (1:0); Weber 19' (2:0)	Summary		Attendance: 2,000; Referee: (Switzerland) W. Werner St. Gallen

2 January 1955 Round 5	Basel	1–4	Zürich	Landhof, Basel
14:30	Hügi (II) 68' (pen. 1:1)	Summary	27' (0:1) Feller; 73' (1:2) Beerli; 74' (1:3) Beerli (1:4) Beerli	Attendance: 5,000; Referee: (Switzerland) Victor Werner Schicker Bern

== See also ==
- History of FC Basel
- List of FC Basel players
- List of FC Basel seasons

== Sources ==
- Die ersten 125 Jahre. Publisher: Josef Zindel im Friedrich Reinhardt Verlag, Basel. ISBN 978-3-7245-2305-5
- The FCB team 1954–55 at fcb-archiv.ch
- Switzerland 1954–55 by Erik Garin at Rec.Sport.Soccer Statistics Foundation
