= 1951–52 Swiss Cup =

Tournament details
- Country: Switzerland

Final positions
- Champions: Grasshopper Club
- Runners-up: Lugano

The 1951–52 Swiss Cup was the 27th season of Switzerland's football cup competition, organised annually since the 1925–26 season by the Swiss Football Association.

== Overview ==
This season's cup competition began with the first games of the first round, played on the week-end of the 23 September 1951. however, a few games were played a few weeks later. The competition was to be completed on Easter Monday, 14 April 1952, with the final, which, since 1937, was traditionally held at the former Wankdorf Stadium in Bern. The clubs from the 1951–52 Swiss 1. Liga were given a bye for the first round, they joined the competition in the second round on the week-end of 14 October. The clubs from this season's Nationalliga A (NLA) and from this season's Nationalliga B (NLB) were given byes for the first two rounds. These teams joined the competition in the third round, which was played on the week-end of 3 and 4 November.

The matches were played in a knockout format. In the event of a draw after 90 minutes, the match went into extra time. In the event of a draw at the end of extra time, a replay was foreseen and this was played on the visiting team's pitch. If the replay ended in a draw after extra time, a toss of a coin would establish the team that qualified for the next round.

== Round 1 ==
In the first round, the lower league teams that had qualified themselves for the competition through their regional football association's regional cup competitions or their association's requirements, competed here. Whenever possible, the draw respected local regionalities. The first round was played on Saturday 23 September 1951, with a number of exceptions that were played a week or two later.

=== Summary ===
Team 1	Score	Team 2
23 September 1951
Delémont	3–1	FC Courtételle
FC Tramelan	1–1 (a.e.t.)	FC Nidau
Zähringia Bern	3–7	Bümpliz
Minerva Bern	4–0	FC Ticino Bern
FC Längasse (Bern)	1–1 (a.e.t.)	FC Sparta Bern
FC Aarberg	3–2 (a.e.t.)	FC Victoria Bern
FC Luterbach	2–2 (a.e.t.)	FC Gerlafingen
Laufen	2–0	Binningen
FC Pratteln	2–1	Black Stars
FC Möhlin-Riburg	3–5 (a.e.t.)	FC Ettingen
Muttenz	3–0	FC Riehen
Zofingen	6–1	FC Schönenwerd
Wohlen	4–2	FC Gränichen
FC Affoltern (ZH)	3–2	FC Langnau am Albis
FC Industrie	1–3	SV Höngg
FC Adliswil	3–0	FC Wädenswil
FC Glattfelden	0–3	FC Phönix Seen (Winterthur)
FC Kollbrunn	0–2	FC Altstetten (Zürich)
FC Neuhausen	1–3	Kreuzlingen
FC Fortuna (SG)	3–1	FC Rorschach
FC St.Margarethen	4–2	FC Winkeln (SG)
FC Uzwil	3–1	FC Wattwil
FC Glarus	4–0	Chur
Kickers Luzern	1–0	Luzerner SC
FC Osogna	0–5	US Pro Daro
FC Noranco	2–4	Bodio
FC Renens	5–0	FC Aigle
FC Chailly/Lausanne	2–1	FC Vallorbe
FC Crissier	1–0	FC Cossonay
Chênois	5–1	CA Genève
Amicale Abattoirs Geneve	2–1	FC Plan-les-Ouates
FC La Neuveville	5–3	FC Fleurier
Delémont	3–1	FC Courtételle
30 September 1951
Bulle	2–1 (a.e.t.)	FC Estavayer-le-Lac
FC Chippis	5–1	FC Saint-Léonard
7 October 1951
FC Nidau	0–2	FC Tramelan
FC Küsnacht (ZH)	6–2	Post Zürich
FC Lenzburg	2–2 (a.e.t.)	Wettingen

Replays

Team 1	Score	Team 2
7 October 1951
FC Nidau	0–2	FC Tramelan
FC Sparta Bern	1–1 (a.e.t.)	FC Längasse (Bern) (t)
FC Gerlafingen	2–1 (a.e.t.)	FC Luterbach
14 October 1951
Wettingen	1–0	FC Lenzburg

- Note: (t): FC Längasse qualified on toss of a coin.

== Round 2 ==
The clubs from the 1951–52 Swiss 1. Liga had been given a bye for the first round, they now joined the competition here, in the second round.

=== Summary ===
Team 1	Score	Team 2
14 October 1951
FC Forward Morges	2–1 (a.e.t.)	FC Renens
Laufen	2–3	Saint-Imier-Sports
Muttenz	0–2	Moutier
Solothurn	2–3	FC Pratteln
Kickers Luzern	0–4	Blue Stars
Kreuzlingen	1–2	Brühl
Schöftland	6–1	Wohlen
Uster	2–0	FC Altstetten (Zürich)
FC Chailly/Lausanne	0–2	Montreux-Sports
CS La Tour-de-Peilz	7–0	FC Chippis
Chênois	1–3	CS International Genève
Martigny-Sports	1–0	Amicale Abattoirs Geneve
FC Crissier	1–2	FC Sierre
Bümpliz	1–3	Yverdon-Sport
Union Sportive Lausanne	5–2	FC Länggasse (Bern)
FC La Neuveville	2–1	Stade Lausanne
Central Fribourg	1–0	FC Tramelan
Bulle	1–0	Vevey Sports
Burgdorf	2–3	Minerva Bern
FC Aarberg	1–3	Thun
FC Helvetia Bern	1–3	Zofingen
FC Gerlafingen	0–1	SC Derendingen
Lengnau	0–1	Delémont
FC Porrentruy	3–1	FC Ettingen
FC Phönix Seen (Winterthur)	1–2 (a.e.t.)	Concordia
SV Höngg	5–0	FC Birsfelden
SC Kleinhüningen	2–0	FC Adliswil
FC Affoltern (ZH)	0–2	FC Trimbach
Bodio	0–1	Red Star
FC Olten	1–2	US Pro Daro
Baden	1–3	FC Küsnacht (ZH)
FC St.Margarethen	0–4	Arbon
FC Wetzikon	2–3	FC Uzwil
SV Ceresio Schaffhausen	5–3	FC Glarus
21 October 1951
Wettingen	1–0	Old Boys
28 October 1951
FC Wil	2–1	FC Fortuna (SG)

== Round 3 ==
The teams from the NLA and NLB entered the cup competition in this round. However, the teams from the NLA were seeded and could not be drawn against each other. Whenever possible, the draw respected local regionalities. The third round was played on the week-end of 4 November.

=== Summary ===
Team 1	Score	Team 2
4 November 1951
Basel	7–0	Wettingen
Grasshopper Club	11–2	US Pro Daro
SC Derendingen	0–3	Young Boys
Bellinzona	3–0	Blue Stars
Bern	3–3 (a.e.t.)	Thun
FC Küsnacht (ZH)	0–8	Chiasso
FC La Neuveville	0–6	La Chaux-de-Fonds
Lausanne-Sport	5–2	Union Sportive Lausanne
Lugano	6–1	FC Trimbach
Servette	12–0	Martigny-Sports
Young Fellows	10–2	FC Uzwil
Zürich	7–1	SV Höngg
Yverdon-Sport	1–2	Biel-Bienne
Locarno	6–1	Red Star
Aarau	4–1	Concordia
Arbon	1–0	Schaffhausen
Fribourg	5–3	Central Fribourg
SC Kleinhüningen	1–2	Nordstern
Uster	2–6	St. Gallen
Zofingen	0–2	Luzern
Cantonal Neuchâtel	2–0	Saint-Imier-Sports
Étoile-Sporting	4–2	Moutier
Grenchen	3–1	Minerva Bern
ES Malley	7–0	Bulle
Mendrisio	3–1	Schöftland
FC Pratteln	3–9	SC Zug
Urania Genève Sport	2–0	CS La Tour-de-Peilz
Winterthur	4–0	SV Ceresio Schaffhausen
CS International Genève	2–1	Montreux-Sports
FC Wil	4–3	Brühl
Delémont	1–0	FC Porrentruy
FC Forward Morges	1–1 (a.e.t.)	FC Sierre

Replays

Team 1	Score	Team 2
18 November 1951
FC Sierre	1–0	FC Forward Morges
25 November 1951
Thun	6–2	Bern

=== Matches ===
4 November 1951
14:30

Basel	7–0	Wettingen
Hügi (I) 14' (1:0); Suter 19' (2:0); Hügi (II) 22' (3:0); 49' (o.g. 4:0); Hügi (II) 54' (5:0); Stöcklin 57' (6:0); Hügi (II) 75' (7:0)	FCB summary

Landhof, Basel
Attendance: 1,200
Referee: (Switzerland) Paul von Wartburg (Bern)
- Wettingen played 1951/1952 in the 2. Liga (fourth tier).

4 November 1951

Servette	12–0	Martigny-Sports
4x Züfle; 2x A. Mauron; 2x Wyler; 3x Pasteur; 1x Mezzena	Servette summary

Stade des Charmilles, Geneva
- Martigny-Sports played 1951/1952 in the 1. Liga (third tier).

4 November 1951

Zürich	7–1	SV Höngg
Lehrieder (1:0); Lehrieder (2:0); Koch 17' (3:0); Eckert 23' (4:0); Lehrieder 26' (5:0); Siegenthaler 54' (6:0); Lehrieder 73' (7:1)	FCZ summary	54' (6:1) Walder

Letzigrund, Zürich
Attendance: 1,200
Referee: (Switzerland) Eugen Scherz (Bern)
- Höngg played 1951/1952 in the 2. Liga (fourth tier).

4 November 1951

Aarau	4–1	Concordia
Goal	FCA summary	Goal

Stadion Brügglifeld, Aarau
- Aarau played 1951/1952 in the NLB and Concordia played in the 1. Liga.

== Round 4 ==
=== Summary ===
Team 1	Score	Team 2
23 December 1951
Basel	3–2	Locarno
Chiasso	3–1	Luzern
Servette	3–0	Étoile-Sporting
Arbon	1–3	Bellinzona
Grenchen	1–1 (a.e.t.)	La Chaux-de-Fonds
SC Zug	1–2 (a.e.t.)	Grasshopper Club
Urania Genève Sport	3–0	ES Malley
Young Fellows	2–1	St. Gallen
Thun	2–3	CS International Genève
FC Wil	1–2	Winterthur
Delémont	1–3	Young Boys
Lausanne-Sport	1–0	Biel-Bienne
FC Sierre	2–1	Nordstern
Lugano	6–1	Mendrisio
Aarau	0–2	Zürich
Fribourg	0–0 abandoned	Cantonal Neuchâtel

Replays

Team 1	Score	Team 2
30 December 1951
La Chaux-de-Fonds	4–1	Grenchen
Fribourg	2–1	Cantonal Neuchâtel

=== Matches ===
23 December 1951
14:30

Basel	3–2	Locarno
Hügi (II) 2' (1:0); Hügi (II) 28' (2:1); Bader 84' (3:2)	FCB summary	6' (1:1) Ernst; 34' (2:2) Santini

Landhof, Basel
Attendance: 7,500
Referee: (Switzerland) Roger Rapin (Lausanne)

23 December 1951

Servette	3–0	Étoile-Sporting
Wyler; Fatton; Fatton	Servette summary

Stade des Charmilles, Geneva

23 December 1951

Aarau	0–2	Zürich
	FCZ summary	20' (0:1) Bosshard; 47' (0:2) Rossi

Stadion Brügglifeld, Aarau
Attendance: 4,200
Referee: Favre (Saint-Maurice, Switzerland)

== Round 5 ==
=== Summary ===
Team 1	Score	Team 2
30 December 1951
Basel	3–1	Chiasso
Servette	2–0	Bellinzona
Urania Genève Sport	1–2	Young Fellows
CS International Genève	1–0	Winterthur
FC Sierre	2–5	Lugano
6 January 1952
Young Boys	4–1	Lausanne-Sport
Zürich	3–0	Fribourg
La Chaux-de-Fonds	2–2 (a.e.t.)	Grasshopper Club

Replay

Team 1	Score	Team 2
13 January 1952
Grasshopper Club	4–1	La Chaux-de-Fonds

=== Matches ===
30 December 1951
14:30

Basel	3–1	Chiasso
Hügi (II) 43' (1:0); Bopp 76' (pen. 2:1); Hügi (II) 83' (3:1)	FCB summary	69' (1:1) Busenhart

Landhof, Basel
Attendance: 8,000
Referee: (Switzerland) René Baumberger (Lausanne)

30 December 1951

Servette	2–0	Bellinzona
Pasteur (1:0); Züfle (2:0)	Servette summary

Stade des Charmilles, Geneva

6 January 1952

Zürich	3–0	Fribourg
Lehrieder 11' (1:0); Dubs 30' (2:0); Schneiter 85' (3:0)	FCZ summary

Letzigrund, Zürich
Attendance: 4,700
Referee: (Switzerland) René Baumberger (Lausanne)

== Quarter-finals ==
=== Summary ===
Team 1	Score	Team 2
17 February 1952
Basel	6–5	Servette
Young Fellows	1–4	Grasshopper Club
CS International Genève	4–2	Young Boys
Lugano	5–1	Zürich

=== Matches ===
17 February 1952
14:30

Basel	6–5	Servette
Bader 9' (1:0); Hügi (II) 12' (2:0); Thalmann 48' (3:4); Bader 62' (4:4); Thalmann 85' (5:5); Suter (6:5)	FCB summary Servette summary	18' (2:1) Fatton; 22' (2:2) Züfle; 39' (2:3) A. Mauron; 44' (2:4) Fatton; 65' (4:5) Fatton

Landhof, Basel
Attendance: 9,200
Referee: (Switzerland) Roger Rapin (Lausanne)

17 February 1952

Lugano	5–1	Zürich
Lakenberg 2' (1:0); Antonio Torreano 6' (2:0); Mario Bernasconi 22' (3:0); Sergio Bernasconi 80' (4:1); Adriano Kauer 84' (5:1)	FCZ summary	30' (3:1) Rossi

Cornaredo Stadium, Lugano
Attendance: 4,000
Referee: (Switzerland) Victor Werner Schicker (Bern)

== Semi-finals ==
=== Summary ===
Team 1	Score	Team 2
23 March 1952
Basel	0–2	Grasshopper Club
CS International Genève	1–6	Lugano

=== Matches ===
23 March 1952
15:00

Basel	0–2	Grasshopper Club
	FCB summary	25' (0:1) Ballaman; 28' (0:2) Berbig

Landhof, Basel
Attendance: 16,000
Referee: (Switzerland) Josef Gulde (St. Gallen)

23 March 1952

CS International Genève	1–6	Lugano
Carrel 27' (1:1)	Summary	15' (0:1) Sergio Bernasconi; 77' (1:2) Sergio Bernasconi; 79' (1:3) Mario Bernasconi; 85' (1:4) Mario Bernasconi; 87' (1:5) Sergio Bernasconi; 90' (pen.) Adriano Kauer

- CS International Genève played 1951/52 in the 1. Liga (third tier).

== Final ==
The final was held at the former Wankdorf Stadium in Bern on Easter Monday 1952.

=== Summary ===
Team 1	Score	Team 2
14 April 1952
Grasshopper Club	2–0	Lugano

=== Telegram ===
14 April 1952
15:00

Grasshopper Club	2–0	Lugano
Berbig 8' (1:0); Hüssy 41' (2:0)	Fussball-Schweiz summary

Wankdorf Stadium, Bern
Attendance: 32,000
Referee: (Switzerland) Roger Rapin (Lausanne)

Grasshopper Club won the cup and this was the club's twelfth cup title to this date. A few weeks later, on 8 June, GC secured the Swiss league championship. Thus they won the domestic double and this was fifth time that the club achieved the double to this date.

== Further in Swiss football ==
- 1951–52 Nationalliga A
- 1951–52 Swiss 1. Liga

== Sources ==
- Fussball-Schweiz
- FCB Cup games 1951–52 at fcb-achiv.ch
- Switzerland 1951–52 at RSSSF

Preceded by 1950–51	Swiss Cup seasons	Succeeded by 1952–53
