= 1950–51 Nationalliga A =

Swiss football season

Nationalliga A
- Season: 1950–51
- Champions: Lausanne-Sport
- Relegated: Grenchen; Cantonal Neuchâtel
- Top goalscorer: Hans-Peter Friedländer] (Lausanne-Sport); 22 goals

Nationalliga B
- Season: 1950–51
- Champions: Grasshopper Club
- Promoted: Grasshopper Club; Bern
- Relegated: Concordia; Moutier
- Top goalscorer: Alfred Bickel (Grasshopper Club); 26 goals

The following is the summary of the Swiss National League in the 1950–51 football season, both Nationalliga A and Nationalliga B. This was the 54th season of top-tier and the 53rd season of second-tier football in Switzerland.

== Overview ==
The Swiss Football Association (ASF/SFV) had 28 member clubs at this time which were divided into two divisions of 14 teams each. The teams played a double round-robin to decide their table positions. Two points were awarded for a win and one point was awarded for a draw. The top tier (NLA) was contested by the top 12 teams from the previous season and the two newly promoted teams Cantonal Neuchâtel and Young Boys. The last two teams in the league table at the end of the season were to be relegated.

The second-tier (NLB) was contested by the two teams that had been relegated from the NLA at the end of the last season, these were Bern and St. Gallen, the ten teams that had been in third to twelfth position last season and the two newly promoted teams from the 1. Liga Winterthur and Concordia. The top two teams at the end of the season would be promoted to the 1951–52 NLA and the two last placed teams would be relegated to the 1951–52 Swiss 1. Liga.

== Nationalliga A ==
=== Teams, locations ===
Team	Based in	Canton	Stadium	Capacity
FC Basel	Basel	Basel-Stadt	Landhof	4,000
AC Bellinzona	Bellinzona	Ticino	Stadio Comunale Bellinzona	5,000
FC Biel-Bienne	Biel/Bienne	Bern	Stadion Gurzelen	5,500
FC Cantonal Neuchâtel	Neuchâtel	Neuchâtel	Stade de la Maladière	25,500
FC Chiasso	Chiasso	Ticino	Stadio Comunale Riva IV	4,000
FC Grenchen	Grenchen	Solothurn	Stadium Brühl	15,100
FC La Chaux-de-Fonds	La Chaux-de-Fonds	Neuchâtel	Centre Sportif de la Charrière	10,000
FC Lausanne-Sport	Lausanne	Vaud	Pontaise	30,000
FC Locarno	Locarno	Ticino	Stadio comunale Lido	5,000
FC Lugano	Lugano	Ticino	Cornaredo Stadium	6,330
Servette FC	Geneva	Geneva	Stade des Charmilles	27,000
BSC Young Boys	Bern	Bern	Wankdorf Stadium	56,000
FC Young Fellows	Zürich	Zürich	Utogrund	2,850
FC Zürich	Zürich	Zürich	Letzigrund	25,000

=== Final league table ===
Pos	Team	Pld	W	D	L	GF	GA	GD	Pts	Qualification or relegation
1	Lausanne-Sport	26	14	6	6	58	31	+27	34	Swiss Champions
2	Chiasso	26	12	7	7	60	52	+8	31	
3	La Chaux-de-Fonds	26	11	8	7	72	64	+8	30	Swiss Cup winners
4	Basel	26	12	4	10	62	51	+11	28	
5	Zürich	26	13	2	11	65	62	+3	28	
6	Servette	26	11	6	9	46	43	+3	28	
7	Young Boys	26	11	5	10	53	55	−2	27	
8	Lugano	26	9	8	9	33	42	−9	26	
9	Bellinzona	26	10	5	11	36	45	−9	25	
10	Young Fellows Zürich	26	9	6	11	55	58	−3	24	
11	Biel-Bienne	26	8	7	11	45	41	+4	23	
12	Locarno	26	8	6	12	40	43	−3	22	Play-out against relegation
13	Grenchen	26	8	6	12	31	47	−16	22	Play-out against relegation
14	Cantonal Neuchâtel	26	4	8	14	41	63	−22	16	Relegated to 1951–55 NLB

Source: rsssf.com
Rules for classification: 1) Points; 2) Goal difference within the league, however with play-off for qualifiers;

=== Results ===
Home \ Away	BAS	BEL	BB	CAN	CDF	CHI	GRE	LS	LOC	LUG	SER	YB	YFZ	ZUR
Basel		3–0	2–2	2–3	4–1	6–2	0–2	1–4	2–1	1–1	4–2	5–1	3–0	5–1
Bellinzona	2–4		0–3	1–0	2–2	0–3	2–1	1–0	1–1	4–1	1–3	3–0	2–2	2–2
Biel-Bienne	1–1	0–1		2–2	1–1	1–3	8–0	3–1	1–2	2–0	3–3	0–2	0–0	4–1
Cantonal Neuchâtel	0–2	1–2	2–0		3–3	3–1	1–1	0–6	1–1	0–1	4–5	0–0	1–3	1–3
La Chaux-de-Fonds	4–3	3–0	3–0	3–5		4–3	1–2	5–5	4–2	5–2	2–1	1–1	4–1	6–1
Chiasso	2–1	1–1	3–2	1–1	5–2		3–2	0–5	1–2	2–0	5–1	5–0	3–1	4–0
Grenchen	0–1	1–2	0–2	2–1	3–3	1–1		1–0	1–0	2–0	2–2	0–4	2–2	2–0
Lausanne-Sports	3–1	2–1	1–0	2–2	0–2	6–2	0–0		0–0	4–1	2–1	1–2	4–1	4–1
Locarno	5–0	0–1	1–2	4–3	2–2	3–0	3–1	0–1		1–3	0–2	0–3	2–1	4–2
Lugano	1–0	2–1	2–1	1–1	2–2	0–0	3–1	1–1	2–1		1–1	1–0	0–0	4–0
Servette	2–2	0–1	1–0	1–0	1–0	2–3	3–1	1–1	2–2	3–0		2–1	4–0	3–1
Young Boys	3–6	1–0	2–2	7–2	4–3	3–3	2–1	0–2	2–1	2–1	3–0		4–5	1–3
Young Fellows	6–2	3–1	2–3	6–1	3–6	2–2	0–2	3–1	2–0	2–2	1–0	2–3		4–5
Zürich	2–1	4–2	5–2	3–2	8–0	2–2	3–0	1–2	2–0	5–1	3–0	5–2	1–3	

Source: rsssf.com
Legend: Blue = home team win; Yellow = draw; Red = away team win.

=== Play-out against relegation ===
Locarno and Grenchen ended the season level on points in joint twelfth/thirteenth position. Therefore, a play-out against relegation was required to decide the relegation slot. The decider match was played on 21 June at the Letzigrund in Zürich.

Team 1	Score	Team 2
Locarno	4–2 (a.e.t.)	Grenchen

Locarno won and remained in the division for the next season. Grenchen were relegated to 1951–52 NLB.

=== Topscorers ===
Rank	Player	Nat.	Goals	Club
1.	Hans-Peter Friedländer	(Switzerland)	22	Lausanne-Sport
2.	Josef Hügi	(Switzerland)	21	Basel
3.	Charles Antenen	(Switzerland)	20	La Chaux-de-Fonds
4.	Jacques Fatton	(Switzerland)	22	Servette
5.	Walter Beerli	(Switzerland)	17	Young Boys
5.	Hans Siegenthaler	(Switzerland)	17	Young Fellows Zürich
7.	Walter Fink	(Switzerland)	15	Young Fellows Zürich
7.	Ferdinando Riva	(Switzerland)	15	Chiasso
9.	Traugott Oberer	(Switzerland)	14	Chiasso
9.	Ezio Sormani	(Switzerland)	14	Bellinzona
9.	Giovanni Zanollo	(Italy)	14	Chiasso

== Nationalliga B ==
=== Teams, locations ===
Team	Based in	Canton	Stadium	Capacity
FC Aarau	Aarau	Aargau	Stadion Brügglifeld	9,240
FC Bern	Bern	Bern	Stadion Neufeld	14,000
FC Concordia Basel	Basel	Basel-Stadt	Stadion Rankhof	7,000
FC Étoile-Sporting	La Chaux-de-Fonds	Neuchâtel	Les Foulets / Terrain des Eplatures	1,000 / 500
FC Fribourg	Fribourg	Fribourg	Stade Universitaire	9,000
Grasshopper Club Zürich	Zürich	Zürich	Hardturm	20,000
FC Luzern	Lucerne	Lucerne	Stadion Allmend	25,000
FC Mendrisio	Mendrisio	Ticino	Centro Sportivo Comunale	4,000
FC Moutier	Moutier	Bern	Stade de Chalière	5,000
FC Nordstern Basel	Basel	Basel-Stadt	Rankhof	7,600
FC St. Gallen	St. Gallen	St. Gallen	Espenmoos	11,000
Urania Genève Sport	Genève	Geneva	Stade de Frontenex	4,000
FC Winterthur	Winterthur	Zürich	Schützenwiese	8,550
SC Zug	Zug	Zug	Herti Allmend Stadion	6,000

=== Final league table ===
Pos	Team	Pld	W	D	L	GF	GA	GD	Pts	Qualification or relegation
1	Grasshopper Club Zürich	26	25	0	1	116	21	+95	50	NLB champions and promoted to 1951–52 Nationalliga A
2	FC Bern	26	16	5	5	62	36	+26	37	Promoted to 1951–52 Nationalliga A
3	FC Étoile-Sporting	26	12	5	9	66	48	+18	29	
4	FC Nordstern Basel	26	13	3	10	52	59	−7	29	
5	FC Winterthur	26	8	10	8	38	29	+9	26	
6	FC Fribourg	26	9	7	10	40	45	−5	25	
7	FC St. Gallen	26	10	4	12	46	43	+3	24	
8	FC Aarau	26	10	3	13	46	49	−3	23	
9	FC Luzern	26	8	6	12	39	48	−9	22	
10	Urania Genève Sport	26	8	5	13	38	52	−14	21	
11	SC Zug	26	8	5	13	41	67	−26	21	
12	FC Mendrisio	26	7	6	13	49	70	−21	20	
13	FC Moutier	26	7	5	14	34	65	−31	19	Relegated to 1951–52 1. Liga
14	FC Concordia Basel	26	5	8	13	53	88	−35	18	Relegated to 1951–52 1. Liga

Source: RSSSF
Rules for classification: 1) Points; 2) Goal difference within the league, however with play-off for qualifiers;

== Further in Swiss football ==
- 1950–51 Swiss Cup
- 1950–51 Swiss 1. Liga

== Sources ==
- Switzerland 1950–51 at RSSSF

Preceded by 1949–50	Nationalliga seasons in Switzerland	Succeeded by 1951–52
