= 1950–51 Swiss Cup =

Tournament details
- Country: Switzerland

Final positions
- Champions: La Chaux-de-Fonds
- Runners-up: Locarno

The 1950–51 Swiss Cup was the 26th season of Switzerland's football cup competition, organised annually since the 1925–26 season by the Swiss Football Association.

== Overview ==
This season's cup competition began with the first games of the first round, played on the week-end of the 24 September 1950, with two exceptions. The competition was to be completed on Easter Monday, 26 March 1951, with the final, which, since 1937, was traditionally held at the former Wankdorf Stadium in Bern. The clubs from the 1950–51 Swiss 1. Liga were given a bye for the first round, they joined the competition in the second round on the week-end of 8 October. The clubs from this season's Nationalliga A (NLA) and from this season's Nationalliga B (NLB) were given byes for the first two rounds. These teams joined the competition in the third round, which was played on the week-end of 29 October.

The matches were played in a knockout format. In the event of a draw after 90 minutes, the match went into extra time. In the event of a draw at the end of extra time, a replay was foreseen and this was played on the visiting team's pitch. In the early rounds, if the replay ended in a draw after extra time, a toss of a coin would establish the team that qualified for the next round. However, in the quarter-finals and later, a second replay at a neutral stadium would take place.

== Round 1 ==
In the first round, the lower league teams that had qualified themselves for the competition through their regional football association's regional cup competitions or their association's requirements, competed here. Whenever possible, the draw respected local regionalities. The games of the first round were played on Saturday 24 September 1950, with two exceptions and these were played one week later.

=== Summary ===
Team 1	Score	Team 2
24 September 1950
Amicale Abattoirs Geneve	1–1 (a.e.t.)	Compesières FC (GE)
FC Vallorbe	5–5 (a.e.t.)	FC Cully
FC Stade Payerne	3–1	FC Grandson
FC Renens	2–0	Monthey
Sion	2–0	FC Saint-Léonard
FC La Neuveville	5–2 (a.e.t.)	FC Noiraigue
FC Madretsch (Biel)	1–1 (a.e.t.)	FC Auvernier
FC Pieterlen	3–2	FC Bettlach
Bümpliz	10–1	WEF Bern
Minerva Bern	2–2 (a.e.t.)	Dürrenast
FC Lerchenfeld (Thun)	1–3	US Bienne-Boujean
SV Lyss	1–2	FC Biberist
FC Oensingen	2–3 (a.e.t.)	Post Bern
FC Kirchberg	2–4	Burgdorf
Binningen	9–0	FC Fontenais
Muttenz	5–3	FC Arlesheim
FC Münchenstein	9–2	FC Gelterkinden
Zofingen	4–0	FC Niedergösgen
Wettingen	5–0	FC Rohr
FC Menziken	6–1	FC Suhr
FC Industrie	1–4	FC Affoltern-Zürich
FC Schlieren (ZH)	0–2	FC Langnau am Albis
FC Küsnacht (ZH)	1–1 (a.e.t.)	SC Veltheim
FC Tössfeld	5–4 (a.e.t.)	FC Phönix Seen (Winterthur)
FC Töss	2–0	FC Ober-Winterthur
FC Uzwil	1–4	Gossau
FC Thayngen	3–4	Kreuzlingen
FC Rorschach	5–1	FC Rheineck
FC Glarus	2–3 (a.e.t.)	FC Lachen
FC Sargans	0–11	FC Ems
FC Wattwil	2–3 (a.e.t.)	FC Rüti (ZH)
Luzerner SC	7–4 (a.e.t.)	FC Zug
Bodio	5–0	FC Melide
FC Tramelan	1–1 (a.e.t.)	FC Reconvilier
1 October 1950
SV Seebach	4–1	FC Oerlikon (ZH)
FC Forward Morges	6–0	FC Lutry

Replays

Team 1	Score	Team 2
1 October 1950
Compesières FC (t)	1–1 (a.e.t.)	Amicale Abattoirs Geneve
SC Veltheim	1–2	FC Küsnacht (ZH)
FC Reconvilier	7–2	FC Tramelan
8 October 1950
FC Cully	1–2	FC Vallorbe
FC Auvernier	1–2	FC Madretsch (Biel)
Dürrenast	2–0	Minerva Bern

- Note: (t): Compesières FC qualified on toss of a coin.

== Round 2 ==
The clubs from the 1950–51 1. Liga had been given a bye for the first round, they now joined the competition here, in the second round.

=== Summary ===
Team 1	Score	Team 2
8 October 1950
Gossau	1–3	Brühl
15 October 1950
Compesières FC	1–3	CS International Genève
FC Sierre	2–1	Sion
Martigny-Sports	3–2 (a.e.t.)	FC Renens
FC Forward Morges	3–1	CS La Tour-de-Peilz
Yverdon-Sport	4–0	FC La Neuveville
FC Madretsch (Biel)	1–4	Stade Nyonnais
FC Stade Payerne	1–2	Montreux-Sports
Vevey Sports	3–0	US Bienne-Boujean
Stade Lausanne	3–1	FC Pieterlen
Bümpliz	1–4	ES Malley
FC Vallorbe	1–0	FC Ambrosiana Lausanne
Central Fribourg	5–4	Burgdorf
FC Helvetia Bern	1–3	Luzerner SC
FC Reconvilier	2–1	Saint-Imier Sports
FC Biberist	2–4	FC Porrentruy
Thun	5–1	Dürrenast
Post Bern	1–5	Lengnau
Zofingen	2–1 (a.e.t.)	FC Victoria Bern
Bodio	6–1	FC Olten
Solothurn	5–3	Wettingen
SV Seebach	0–3	SC Derendingen
Schöftland	0–0 (a.e.t.)	FC Menziken
FC Trimbach	7–1	FC Affoltern-Zürich
Baden	1–0	FC Langnau am Albis
Binningen	1–6	SC Kleinhüningen
FC Münchenstein	4–0	FC Pratteln
Muttenz	1–6	FC Birsfelden
FC Rorschach	3–2	Arbon
FC Ems	4–0	FC Altstetten (Zürich)
FC Töss	3–1	Red Star
FC Rüti (ZH)	0–2	FC Wetzikon
FC Küsnacht (ZH)	3–2	Blue Stars
Uster	4–1	FC Lachen
Kreuzlingen	1–4	Schaffhausen
FC Wil	7–0	FC Tössfeld

Replay

Team 1	Score	Team 2
22 October 1950
FC Menziken	3–1	Schöftland

== Round 3 ==
The teams from this season's NLA and this season's NLB entered the cup competition in this round. However, the teams from the NLA were seeded and could not be drawn against each other. Whenever possible, the draw respected local regionalities. The third round was played on the week-end of 29 October.

=== Summary ===
Team 1	Score	Team 2
29 October 1950
FC Küsnacht (ZH)	2–0	SC Zug
St. Gallen	0–2	FC Wil
Stade Nyonnais	1–5	Étoile-Sporting
La Chaux-de-Fonds	4–1	Martigny-Sports
Moutier	7–0	Stade Lausanne
Lausanne-Sport	7–1	Vallorbe-Sports
Solothurn	1–2	Young Boys
Bodio	3–1	FC Porrentruy
Bern	8–0	FC Menziken
Nordstern	1–6	Lengnau
Urania Genève Sport	3–1	Vevey Sports
FC Sierre	0–1	Fribourg
Central Fribourg	1–0	FC Forward Morges
ES Malley	1–2 (a.e.t.)	Yverdon-Sport
Servette	4–1	CS International Genève
Biel-Bienne	7–3	Zofingen
FC Münchenstein	0–6	Basel
Uster	0–2	Winterthur
Schaffhausen	0–5	Locarno
FC Birsfelden	1–2	Grenchen
FC Reconvilier	2–3	FC Trimbach
Concordia	2–0	Luzerner SC
Lugano	6–0	FC Töss
Young Fellows	9–1	SC Derendingen
Chiasso	7–3	FC Wetzikon
Grasshopper Club	4–2	Baden
Zürich	9–0	FC Ems
Bellinzona	4–2	Brühl
Mendrisio	2–1	FC Rorschach
Thun	3–2 (a.e.t.)	Aarau
Luzern	5–2	SC Kleinhüningen

=== Matches ===
29 October 1950

Servette	4–1	CS International Genève
1x Jerusalem; 2x Fatton; 1x Peyla	Servette summary	Goal

Stade des Charmilles, Geneva
- CS International Genève played 1951/52 in the 1. Liga (third tier).

29 October 1950

FC Münchenstein	0–6	Basel
	FCB summary	15' (0:1) Stäuble; (penalty missed) 50′ Wenk; 55' (0:2) Stäuble (0:3) Hügi (II) (0:4) Hügi (II) (0:5) Stäuble (0:6) Wenk

Sportplatz Heiligholz, Münchenstein
Attendance: 2,300
Referee: (Switzerland) Keller (Seuzach)
- FC Münchenstein played 1951/52 in the 2. Liga (fourth tier)

29 October 1950

Zürich	9–0	FC Ems
Bosshard (1:0); Bosshard (2:0); Bosshard (3:0); Lehrieder (4:0); Lehrieder (5:0); Lehrieder (6:0); Andres (7:0); Andres (8:0); Koch (9:0)	FCZ summary

Letzigrund, Zürich
Attendance: 1,500
Referee: (Switzerland) Edmund Bertsche (Neuhausen am Rheinfall)
- FC Ems played 1951/52 in the 2. Liga (fourth tier)

29 October 1950

Thun	3–2 (a.e.t.)	Aarau
Goal	FCA summary	Goal

Stadion Lachen, Thun

== Round 4 ==
=== Summary ===
Team 1	Score	Team 2
3 December 1950
Étoile-Sporting	0–2	La Chaux-de-Fonds
Moutier	0–4	Lausanne-Sport
Young Boys	9–0	Bodio
Bern	2–0	Lengnau
Urania Genève Sport	1–3 (a.e.t.)	Fribourg
Central Fribourg	0–4	Cantonal Neuchâtel
Biel-Bienne	0–1	Basel
Grenchen	5–1	FC Trimbach
Concordia	3–1	Lugano
Young Fellows	3–1	Chiasso
Grasshopper Club	5–2	Zürich
Bellinzona	3–1	Mendrisio
Thun	6–1	Luzern
17 December 1950
Yverdon-Sport	3–4	Servette
FC Küsnacht (ZH)	0–2	FC Wil
24 December 1950
Winterthur	1–2	Locarno

=== Matches ===
3 December 1950

Biel-Bienne	0–1	Basel
	FCB summary	59' (0:1) Stöcklin

Gurzelen Stadion, Biel/Bienne
Attendance: 3,500
Referee: (Switzerland) Roger Rapin (Lausanne)

3 December 1950

Grasshopper Club	5–2	Zürich
Ballaman 47' (1:2); Bickel 65' (2:2); Martin 74' (3:2); Bickel 80' (4:2); Ballaman 85' (5:2)	FCZ summary	19' (0:1) Bosshard; 38' (0:2) Kohler

Hardturm, Zürich
Attendance: 8,000
Referee: (Switzerland) Paul von Wartburg (Bern)

17 December 1950

Yverdon-Sport	3–4	Servette
Goal	Servette summary	S. Bernasconi; Jerusalem; Fatton; Züfle

Stade Municipal, Yverdon-les-Bains

== Round 5 ==
=== Summary ===
Team 1	Score	Team 2
7 January 1951
FC Wil	1–3	La Chaux-de-Fonds
Lausanne-Sport	4–1	Young Boys
Bern	7–0	Fribourg
Basel	1–2	Locarno
Grenchen	3–1	Concordia
Young Fellows	1–3	Grasshopper Club
Bellinzona	5–0	Thun
14 January 1951
Cantonal Neuchâtel	1–0	Servette

=== Matches ===
7 January 1951
14:30

Basel	1–2	Locarno
Bader 10' (1:1); Müller (red card) 64'; Wenk (red card) 65'	FCB summary	2' (0:1) Ernst; 50' (1:2) Ruch

Stadion Schützenmatte, Basel
Attendance: 5,300
Referee: (Switzerland) Maurice Tasca (Geneva)

14 January 1951

Cantonal Neuchâtel	1–0	Servette
Goal	Servette summary

Stade de la Maladière, Neuchâtel

== Quarter-finals ==
=== Summary ===
Team 1	Score	Team 2
14 January 1951
La Chaux-de-Fonds	2–1	Lausanne-Sport
Locarno	2–1	Grenchen
21 January 1951
Bern	2–1	Cantonal Neuchâtel
28 January 1951
Grasshopper Club	0–2	Bellinzona

== Semi-finals ==
=== Summary ===
Team 1	Score	Team 2
25 February 1951
Bern	2–4	La Chaux-de-Fonds
Locarno	1–1 (a.e.t.)	Bellinzona

Replay

Team 1	Score	Team 2
4 March 1951
Bellinzona	2–2 (a.e.t.)	Locarno

Second replay

Team 1	Score	Team 2
19 March 1951
Locarno	3–1 (a.e.t.)	Bellinzona

=== Matches ===
25 February 1951

Bern	2–4	La Chaux-de-Fonds
Roger Quinche 38' (1:2); Just 60' (2:3)	Summary	21' (0:1) Kernen; 26' (0:2) Chodat; 31' (pen.) Morand; 64' (2:4) Morand

Stadion Neufeld, Bern

25 February 1951

Locarno	1–1 (a.e.t.)	Bellinzona
Vincenzo Giuletti 5' (1:0)	Summary	82' (1:1) Lusenti

Stadio comunale Lido, Locarno

4 March 1951

Bellinzona	2–2 (a.e.t.)	Locarno
Argenti 18' (o.g.); Sormani 112' (2:1)	Summary	36' (1:1) Buser; 120' (2:2) Ferraris

Stadio Comunale Bellinzona, Bellinzona

19 March 1951

Locarno	3–1 (a.e.t.)	Bellinzona
Ernst 44' (1:0); Ernst 97' (2:1); Canetti 106' (3:1)	Summary	50' (1:1) Sartori

Campo Marzio, Lugano

== Final ==
The Cup final was held on Easter Monday 1951 and played at the former Wankdorf Stadium in Bern.

=== Summary ===
Team 1	Score	Team 2
26 March 1951
La Chaux-de-Fonds	3–2	Locarno

=== Telegram ===
26 March 1951
15:00

La Chaux-de-Fonds	3–2	Locarno
Antenen 24' (1:0); Antenen 36' (2:1); Chodat 43' (3:1)	Fussball-Schweiz summary	35' (1:1) Ernst; 72' (3:2) Canetti

Wankdorf Stadium, Bern
Attendance: 26,000
Referee: (Switzerland) Willi Rufli (Bremgarten, Aargau)

La Chaux-de-Fonds won the cup and this was the club's second cup title to this date.

== Further in Swiss football ==
- 1950–51 Nationalliga A
- 1950–51 Swiss 1. Liga

== Sources ==
- Fussball-Schweiz
- FCB Cup games 1950–51 at fcb-achiv.ch
- Switzerland 1950–51 at RSSSF

Preceded by 1949–50	Swiss Cup seasons	Succeeded by 1951–52
