= 1950–51 Swiss 1. Liga =

1. Liga
- Season: 1950–51
- Champions: 1. Liga champions: Malley; Group West: Malley; Group Cenral: Thun; Group South and East: Schaffhausen
- Promoted: Malley; Schaffhausen
- Relegated: Group West: Stade Nyonnais; Group Central: FC Viktoria Bern; FC Pratteln; Group South and East: FC Altstetten
- Matches: 3 times 132 and 3 deciders plus 3 play-offs and 3 play-outs

The 1950–51 1. Liga season was the 19th season of the 1. Liga since its creation in 1931. At this time, the 1. Liga was the third-tier of the Swiss football league system.

== Format ==
There were 36 teams competing in the 1. Liga this season. They were divided into three regional groups, each group with 12 teams. Within each group, the teams would play a double round-robin to decide their league position. Two points were awarded for a win and one point was awarded for a draw. The three group winners then contested a play-off round to decide the two promotion slots to the second-tier (NLB). The last placed team in each group were directly relegated to the 2. Liga (fourth tier). The second last placed team from each group then contested a play-out to decide the fourth and last relegation slot.

== Group West ==
=== Teams, locations ===
Club	Based in	Canton	Stadium	Capacity
Ambrosiana Lausanne	Lausanne	Vaud		
FC Central Fribourg	Fribourg	Fribourg	Guintzet	2,000
CS International Genève	Geneva	Geneva		
CS La Tour-de-Peilz	La Tour-de-Peilz	Vaud	Stade de Bel-Air	1,000
ES FC Malley	Malley	Vaud	Centre sportif de la Tuilière	1,500
FC Martigny-Sports	Martigny	Valais	Stade d'Octodure	2,500
FC Montreux-Sports	Montreux	Vaud	Stade de Chailly	1,000
FC Sierre	Sierre	Valais	Complexe Ecossia	2,000
FC Stade Lausanne	Ouchy, Lausanne	Vaud	Centre sportif de Vidy	1,000
FC Stade Nyonnais	Nyon	Vaud	Stade de Colovray	7,200
Vevey Sports	Vevey	Vaud	Stade de Copet	4,000
Yverdon-Sport FC	Yverdon-les-Bains	Vaud	Stade Municipal	6,600

=== Final league table ===
Pos	Team	Pld	W	D	L	GF	GA	GD	Pts	Qualification or relegation
1	ES FC Malley	22	16	4	2	77	20	+57	36	To promotion play-off
2	Vevey Sports	21	13	4	4	44	20	+24	30	
3	CS La Tour-de-Peilz	22	11	6	5	50	41	+9	28	
4	Yverdon-Sport FC	22	10	5	7	46	37	+9	25	
5	FC Sierre	22	11	3	8	46	46	0	25	
6	FC Martigny-Sports	22	10	3	9	42	35	+7	23	
7	CS International Genève	22	10	1	11	51	40	+11	21	
8	FC Stade Lausanne	22	8	4	10	48	56	−8	20	
9	Central Fribourg	22	8	3	11	51	60	−9	19	
10	FC Ambrosiana Lausanne	22	7	5	10	29	43	−14	19	
11	FC Montreux-Sports	21	7	1	13	42	57	−15	15	Play-out against relegation
12	FC Stade Nyonnais	22	0	1	21	24	95	−71	1	Relegation to 2. Liga

Source: RSSSF
Rules for classification: 1) Points; 2) Goal difference within the league, but decider play-off for qualifiers.

== Group Central ==
=== Teams, locations ===
Club	Based in	Canton	Stadium	Capacity
FC Birsfelden	Birsfelden	Basel-Landschaft	Sternenfeld	9,400
SC Derendingen	Derendingen	Solothurn	Heidenegg	1,500
FC Helvetia Bern	Bern	Bern	Spitalacker, Bern	1,000
SC Kleinhüningen	Basel	Basel-Stadt	Sportplatz Schorenmatte	300
FC Lengnau	Lengnau	Bern	Moos Lengnau BE	3,900
FC Olten	Olten	Solothurn	Sportanlagen Kleinholz	8,000
FC Porrentruy	Porrentruy	Jura	Stade du Tirage	4,226
FC Pratteln	Pratteln	Basel-Landschaft	In den Sandgruben	5,000
Saint-Imier-Sports	Saint-Imier	Bern	Terrain de Fin-des-Fourches	1,000
FC Solothurn	Solothurn	Solothurn	Stadion FC Solothurn	6,750
FC Thun	Thun	Bern	Stadion Lachen	10,350
FC Viktoria Bern	Bern	Bern	Sportanlage - Weissenstein	400

=== Final league table ===
Pos	Team	Pld	W	D	L	GF	GA	GD	Pts	Qualification or relegation
1	FC Solothurn	22	16	2	4	62	26	+36	34	To decider for first place
2	FC Thun	22	16	2	4	63	28	+35	34	To decider for first place
3	FC Lengnau	22	11	4	7	42	37	+5	26	
4	FC Olten	22	10	5	7	57	41	+16	25	
5	FC Helvetia Bern	22	9	6	7	50	42	+8	24	
6	SC Kleinhüningen	22	9	4	9	35	35	0	22	
7	SC Derendingen	22	8	3	11	38	48	−10	19	
8	FC Porrentruy	22	7	5	10	43	57	−14	19	
9	FC Birsfelden	22	8	2	12	44	60	−16	18	
10	Saint-Imier-Sports	22	8	1	13	41	55	−14	17	
11	FC Viktoria Bern	22	7	2	13	41	42	−1	16	Play-out against relegation
12	FC Pratteln	22	3	4	15	38	83	−45	10	Relegation to 2. Liga

Source: RSSSF
Rules for classification: 1) Points; 2) Goal difference within the league, but decider play-off for qualifiers.

=== Decider for first place ===
The decider matches for first place and the group championship were played on 10 and 17 June 1951.

Team 1	Score	Team 2
Thun	5–2	Solothurn
Solothurn	1–0	Thun

The teams were level with one win each and, therefore, a replay was required. This took place on 24 June in Bern.

Team 1	Score	Team 2
Thun	2–1	Solothurn

Thun win and advance to play-offs. Solothurn remain in the division.

== Group South and East ==
=== Teams, locations ===
Club	Based in	Canton	Stadium	Capacity
FC Altstetten (Zürich)	Altstetten	Zürich	Buchlern	1,000
FC Arbon	Arbon	Thurgau	Stacherholz	1,000
FC Baden	Baden	Aargau	Esp Stadium	7,000
FC Blue Stars Zürich	Zürich	Zürich	Hardhof	1,000
SC Brühl	St. Gallen	St. Gallen	Paul-Grüninger-Stadion	4,200
FC Red Star Zürich	Zürich	Zürich	Allmend Brunau	2,000
FC Schaffhausen	Schaffhausen	Schaffhausen	Stadion Breite	7,300
SC Schöftland	Schöftland	Aargau	Sportanlage Rütimatten	2,000
FC Trimbach|	Trimbach	Solothurn	Sportanlage Leinfeld	400
FC Uster|	Uster	Zürich	Sportanlage Buchholz	7,000
FC Wetzikon	Wetzikon	Zürich	Meierwiesen	2,000
FC Wil	Wil	St. Gallen	Sportpark Bergholz	6,048

=== Final league table ===
Pos	Team	Pld	W	D	L	GF	GA	GD	Pts	Qualification or relegation
1	FC Schaffhausen	22	15	5	2	60	21	+39	35	To promotion play-off
2	SC Brühl	22	15	4	3	55	30	+25	34	
3	FC Wil	22	12	3	7	50	29	+21	27	
4	FC Red Star Zürich	22	8	7	7	33	31	+2	23	
5	FC Baden	22	9	5	8	30	34	−4	23	
6	FC Wetzikon	22	8	6	8	42	42	0	22	
7	FC Uster	22	8	4	10	45	41	+4	20	
8	SC Schöftland	22	8	4	10	45	57	−12	20	
9	FC Trimbach	22	7	5	10	38	54	−16	19	
10	FC Blue Stars Zürich	22	5	7	10	45	58	−13	17	
11	FC Arbon	22	6	1	15	36	47	−11	13	Play-out against relegation
12	FC Altstetten (Zürich)	22	4	3	15	19	54	−35	11	Relegation to 2. Liga

Source: RSSSF
Rules for classification: 1) Points; 2) Goal difference within the league, but decider play-off for qualifiers.

== Promotion, relegation ==
=== Promotion play-off ===
The three group winners played a single round-robin to decide the two promotion slots. The promotion play-offs were held on 17 June, 1 and 8 July 1951.

Pos	Team	Pld	W	D	L	GF	GA	GD	Pts	Qualification	ESM	FCS	TUN
1	Malley	2	2	0	0	5	2	+3	4	Champions and promoted	—	—	2–1
2	Schaffhausen	2	1	0	1	5	4	+1	2	Promoted	1–3	—	—
3	Thun	2	0	0	2	2	6	−4	0		—	1–4	—

Source: RSSSF
Rules for classification: 1) Points; 2) Head-to-head 3) Decider.

Malley are 1. Liga Champions and together with runners-up Schaffhausen were promoted to 1951–52 Nationalliga B. Thun remain in the division for the next season.

=== Relegation play-out ===
The three second last placed teams from each group contested a play-out to decide the fourth and final relegation slot. The matches in the play-outs were held on 24 June, 1 and 8 July.

Pos	Team	Pld	W	D	L	GF	GA	GD	Pts	Qualification	ARB	MOS	VIC
1	Arbon	2	1	1	0	7	2	+5	3		—	5–0	—
2	Montreux-Sports	2	1	0	1	3	6	−3	2		—	—	3–1
3	FC Viktoria Bern	2	0	1	1	3	5	−2	1	Relegated to 2. Liga	2–2	—	—

Source: RSSSF
Rules for classification: 1) Points; 2) Head-to-head 3) Decider.

Arbon and Montreux-Sports remained in the division for the next season, FC Viktoria Bern were relegated to 2. Liga.

== Further in Swiss football ==
- 1950–51 Nationalliga A
- 1950–51 Nationalliga B
- 1950–51 Swiss Cup

== Sources ==
- Switzerland 1950–51 at RSSSF

Preceded by 1949–50	Seasons in Swiss 1. Liga	Succeeded by 1951–52
