= Juan Monros =

Spanish footballer

Personal information
- Full name: Juan Monros
- Date of birth: 1928
- Date of death: 2013 (aged 84–85)
- Positions: Defender; midfielder; striker

Senior career*
Years	Team	Apps	(Gls)
1954–1955	FC Basel	10	(4)
1955–1957	Urania Genève Sport	40	(3)
- * Club domestic league appearances and goals

Juan Monros (1928 – 2013) was a Spanish footballer who played in the 1950s. He played mainly as midfielder.

Monros joined FC Basel's first team for their 1954–55 season under player-coach René Bader. After playing in three test matches Monros played his domestic league debut for the club as defender in the away game on 27 February 1955 as Basel lost 0–1 against Bellinzona. He scored his first goal for his club on 17 April in the home game at the Landhof. In this match he played as forward and scored two goals as Basel won 3–2 against the Grasshoppers.

In his sole season by the club Monros played a total of 17 games for Basel scoring a total of six goals. Ten of these games were in the Nationalliga A and seven were friendly games. He scored four goals in the domestic league, the other two were scored during the test games.

Following his time with Basel Monros moved on to play for Urania Genève Sport.

== Sources ==
- Die ersten 125 Jahre. Publisher: Josef Zindel im Friedrich Reinhardt Verlag, Basel. ISBN 978-3-7245-2305-5
- Verein "Basler Fussballarchiv" Homepage

(NB: Despite all efforts, the editor of this book and the authors in "Basler Fussballarchiv" have failed to be able to identify all the players, their date and place of birth or date and place of death, who played in the games during the early years of FC Basel)
