= Albert Haug =

Swiss footballer (1925-2001)

«Leugel» Haug
Personal information
- Full name: Albert «Leugel» Haug
- Date of birth: 12 December 1925
- Date of death: 6 February 2001 (aged 75)
- Position: Midfielder

Senior career*
Years	Team	Apps	(Gls)
1943–1954	FC Zürich		
1954–1955	FC Basel	14	(0)
1955–1957	FC Zürich		
- * Club domestic league appearances and goals

Albert «Leugel» Haug (12 December 1925 – 6 February 2001) was a Swiss footballer who played in the 1940s and 1950s as midfielder.

Haug played ten season for FC Zürich from 1943 to 1954. He then joined FC Basel's first team for their 1954–55 season under player-coach René Bader. After playing in five test games, Haug played his domestic league debut for his new club in the home game at the Landhof on 29 August 1954 against his former club Zürich. But his former club won the match.

Haug played a total of 24 games for Basel without scoring a goal. 14 of these games were in the Nationalliga A, two in the Swiss Cup and eight were friendly games.

Haug played one season for Basel and then returned to his club of origin, where he played another two seasons before he retired from active football.

== Sources ==
- Die ersten 125 Jahre. Publisher: Josef Zindel im Friedrich Reinhardt Verlag, Basel. ISBN 978-3-7245-2305-5
- Verein "Basler Fussballarchiv" Homepage
- Albert «Leugel» Haug on dbfcz.ch
