= Rolf Keller =

Swiss footballer (born 1936)

Personal information
- Full name: Rolf Keller
- Date of birth: 9 October 1936 (age 90)
- Place of birth: Switzerland
- Position: Striker

Senior career*
Years	Team	Apps	(Gls)
1954–1956	FC Basel	9	(3)
1958–1957	Servette FC		
1957–1958	FC Bern	7	(2)
1958–1964	FC Thun	93	(12)
- * Club domestic league appearances and goals

Rolf Keller (born 9 October 1936) is a Swiss former footballer who played as a striker in the 1950s.

Keller joined Basel's first team for their 1954–55 season under player-coach René Bader. He played his domestic league debut for the club in the home game at the Landhof on 31 October 1954 as Basel won 3–1 against Grenchen. He scored his first two goals for his club a week later at home to FC Riehen in the Swiss Cup as Basel won 6–0. He scored his first league goal for his club on 14 November as Basel won 3–2 away to Lugano.

The following season Keller scored a hat-trick in the Swiss Cup on 19 November 1955. Basel won the match 5–0 against local team SC Binningen.

Between the years 1954 and 1956 Keller played 19 games for Basel scoring 11 goals. Nine of these games were in the Nationalliga A, four in the Swiss Cup and six were friendly games. He scored three goals in the domestic league, five goals in the cup and the other three were scored during the test games.

Following his time with FC Basel Keller moved on to play for Servette. He stayed one season with them before he moved on again. This time he moved to FC Bern and stayed here one season. For the 1958–59 season Keller moved on to play for FC Thun, who at this time played in the second tier of Swiss football.

== Sources ==
- Die ersten 125 Jahre. Publisher: Josef Zindel im Friedrich Reinhardt Verlag, Basel. ISBN 978-3-7245-2305-5
- Verein "Basler Fussballarchiv" Homepage
