= Hans-Peter Schär =

Swiss footballer (born 1936)

Personal information
- Full name: Hans-Peter Schär
- Date of birth: 14 April 1936 (age 90)
- Place of birth: Switzerland
- Position: Forward

Senior career*
Years	Team	Apps	(Gls)
1954–1955	FC Basel	2	(0)
1956–1957	Nordstern Basel	2	(0)
1959–1960	Servette		
- * Club domestic league appearances and goals

Hans-Peter Schär (born 14 April 1936) is a Swiss former footballer who played in the 1950s and 1960s. He played as a forward.

Schär joined FC Basel's first team for their 1954–55 season under player-coach René Bader. Schär only played for the club this one season. He played his domestic league debut for the club in the home game at the Landhof on 12 December 1954 as Basel drew 1–1 with the Young Boys.

During his one season with the club, Schär played three games for Basel. Two of these games were in the Nationalliga A, the other was a friendly game. The afore mentioned test match was on 17 February 1955 against local team FC Liestal. In this test game Schär scored four goals and Basel won by seven goals to one.

Following his time with FC Basel Schär moved on to play for Nordstern Basel, who at that time played in the second tier in Swiss football. He later joined Servette.

== Sources ==
- Rotblau: Jahrbuch Saison 2017/2018. Publisher: FC Basel Marketing AG. ISBN 978-3-7245-2189-1
- Die ersten 125 Jahre. Publisher: Josef Zindel im Friedrich Reinhardt Verlag, Basel. ISBN 978-3-7245-2305-5
- Verein "Basler Fussballarchiv" Homepage
