= Luciano Merlini =

Swiss footballer

Personal information
- Full name: Luciano Merlini
- Date of birth: 03.09.1930
- Place of birth: Locarno
- Date of death: 25.04.1986
- Place of death: Lausanne
- Position: Midfielder

Senior career*
Years	Team	Apps	(Gls)
1953–1954	FC Locarno	15	(2)
1954–1955	FC Basel	5	(0)
1955–	SC Burgdorf		
- * Club domestic league appearances and goals

Luciano Merlini is a Swiss former footballer who played in the 1950s. He played as midfielder.

Merlini played for Locarno. Then he joined FC Basel's first team for their 1954–55 season under player-coach René Bader. After playing in five test games, Merlini played his domestic league debut for his new club in the home game at the Landhof on 5 September 1954 as Basel played a 1–1 draw against Bellinzona.

In his one season by Basel, Merlini played a total of 13 games for the club without scoring a goal. Five of these games were in the Nationalliga A, one in the Swiss Cup and the other seven were friendly games.

Following his time with FC Basel Merlini moved on to play for SC Burgdorf

== Sources ==
- Die ersten 125 Jahre. Publisher: Josef Zindel im Friedrich Reinhardt Verlag, Basel. ISBN 978-3-7245-2305-5
- Verein "Basler Fussballarchiv" Homepage

(NB: Despite all efforts, the editors of these books and the authors in "Basler Fussballarchiv" have failed to be able to identify all the players, their date and place of birth or date and place of death, who played in the games during the early years of FC Basel)
