= 1951–52 Nationalliga A =

Swiss football season

Nationalliga A
- Season: 1951–52
- Champions: Grasshopper Club
- Relegated: Young Fellows; Biel-Bienne
- Top goalscorer: Josef Hügi (Basel); 24 goals

Nationalliga B
- Season: 1951–52
- Champions: Fribourg
- Promoted: Fribourg; Grenchen
- Relegated: Mendrisio; Nordstern
- Top goalscorer: Miodrag Glisovic (Malley); 26 goals

The following is the summary of the Swiss National League in the 1951–52 football season, both Nationalliga A and Nationalliga B. This was the 55th season of top-tier and the 54th season of second-tier football in Switzerland.

== Overview ==
The Swiss Football Association (ASF/SFV) had 28 member clubs at this time which were divided into two divisions of 14 teams each. The teams played a double round-robin to decide their table positions. Two points were awarded for a win and one point was awarded for a draw. The top tier (NLA) was contested by the top 12 teams from the previous season and the two newly promoted teams Grasshopper Club and FC Bern. The last two teams in the league table at the end of the season were to be relegated.

The second-tier (NLB) was contested by the two teams that had been relegated from the NLA at the end of the last season, these were FC Cantonal Neuchâtel and Grenchen, the ten teams that had been in third to twelfth position last season and the two newly promoted teams from the 1. Liga Malley and Schaffhausen. The top two teams at the end of the season would be promoted to the 1952–53 NLA and the two last placed teams would be relegated to the 1952–53 Swiss 1. Liga.

== Nationalliga A ==
The season commenced on 23 August 1951 and was completed with the last round on 12 June 1952.

=== Teams, locations ===
Team	Based in	Canton	Stadium	Capacity
FC Basel	Basel	Basel-Stadt	Landhof	4,000
AC Bellinzona	Bellinzona	Ticino	Stadio Comunale Bellinzona	5,000
FC Bern	Bern	Bern	Stadion Neufeld	14,000
FC Biel-Bienne	Biel/Bienne	Bern	Stadion Gurzelen	5,500
FC Chiasso	Chiasso	Ticino	Stadio Comunale Riva IV	4,000
Grasshopper Club Zürich	Zürich	Zürich	Hardturm	20,000
FC La Chaux-de-Fonds	La Chaux-de-Fonds	Neuchâtel	Centre Sportif de la Charrière	10,000
FC Lausanne-Sport	Lausanne	Vaud	Pontaise	30,000
FC Locarno	Locarno	Ticino	Stadio comunale Lido	5,000
FC Lugano	Lugano	Ticino	Cornaredo Stadium	6,330
Servette FC	Geneva	Geneva	Stade des Charmilles	27,000
BSC Young Boys	Bern	Bern	Wankdorf Stadium	56,000
FC Young Fellows	Zürich	Zürich	Utogrund	2,850
FC Zürich	Zürich	Zürich	Letzigrund	25,000

=== Final league table ===
Pos	Team	Pld	W	D	L	GF	GA	GD	Pts	Qualification or relegation
1	Grasshopper Club	26	16	6	4	79	38	+41	38	Swiss Champions and Swiss Cup winners
2	Zürich	26	14	9	3	61	36	+25	37	
3	Chiasso	26	15	5	6	59	49	+10	35	
4	Basel	26	14	3	9	68	47	+21	31	
5	La Chaux-de-Fonds	26	11	8	7	62	45	+17	30	
6	Servette	26	11	6	9	57	45	+12	28	
7	Young Boys	26	10	7	9	61	52	+9	27	
8	Lausanne-Sport	26	8	9	9	39	43	−4	25	
9	Bellinzona	26	8	6	12	43	55	−12	22	
10	Locarno	26	8	6	12	41	66	−25	22	
11	Lugano	26	7	7	12	46	54	−8	21	
12	Bern	26	7	5	14	47	64	−17	19	
13	Young Fellows Zürich	26	5	5	16	36	71	−35	15	Relegated to 1952–53 Nationalliga B
14	Biel-Bienne	26	4	6	16	37	71	−34	14	Relegated to 1952–53 Nationalliga B

Source: RSSSF

=== Results ===
Home \ Away	BAS	BEL	BB	BER	CDF	CHI	GCZ	LS	LOC	LUG	SER	YB	YFZ	ZÜR
Basel		4–1	7–1	5–1	1–5	1–2	2–0	3–2	5–3	2–0	0–3	3–0	6–1	2–2
Bellinzona	6–2		2–2	1–0	1–0	0–0	2–3	1–1	1–3	0–2	3–1	3–0	7–2	4–5
Biel-Bienne	0–3	1–1		3–3	0–0	1–2	2–3	1–1	3–2	6–1	0–3	4–2	0–2	0–5
Bern	2–6	1–0	1–1		1–2	3–2	0–0	1–4	0–0	3–1	6–6	1–6	4–0	0–1
La Chaux-de-Fonds	2–1	1–3	7–1	2–4		2–3	2–1	2–2	1–5	2–0	2–2	1–1	1–1	2–2
Chiasso	1–0	5–1	2–4	5–4	2–3		2–0	2–1	4–1	1–1	1–5	1–0	4–1	1–1
Grasshopper Club	2–2	5–0	1–2	4–2	3–2	1–4		6–1	7–0	5–0	5–1	4–1	4–2	1–1
Lausanne-Sports	1–1	1–0	3–1	2–1	1–2	2–2	1–4		3–1	2–0	0–2	2–1	1–1	1–1
Locarno	0–2	1–1	1–0	1–0	2–2	2–0	3–3	0–1		6–1	3–1	1–1	1–0	1–3
Lugano	0–3	1–1	6–1	2–0	1–1	7–0	2–5	1–1	5–0		1–1	4–4	3–2	2–3
Servette	4–1	1–2	1–0	3–0	2–2	1–2	1–3	3–1	7–1	2–1		1–2	1–1	1–1
Young Boys	4–3	2–1	4–3	3–4	3–1	3–3	2–2	2–1	8–2	1–1	1–2		2–2	2–0
Young Fellows	0–2	5–0	3–1	0–3	2–3	2–5	1–3	2–1	1–1	0–2	4–1	1–6		0–4
Zürich	4–1	6–1	2–0	4–2	4–3	2–3	1–1	2–2	1–3	2–1	2–1	1–0	1–1	

Source: RSSSF
Legend: Blue = home team win; Yellow = draw; Red = away team win.

=== Topscorers ===
Rank	Player	Nat.	Goals	Club
1.	Josef Hügi	(Switzerland)	24	Basel
2.	Robert Ballaman	(Switzerland)	22	Grasshopper Club
3.	Ferdinando Riva	(Switzerland)	19	Chiasso
4.	Eugen Meier	(Switzerland)	18	Young Boys
4.	Walter Bosshard	(Switzerland)	18	Zürich
6.	Jacques Fatton	(Switzerland)	16	Servette
6.	Charles Rossi	(Switzerland)	16	Zürich
8.	Hans-Peter Friedländer	(Switzerland)	14	Lausanne-Sport
8.	Berbig	(Switzerland)	14	Grasshopper Club
8.	Ezio Sormani	(Switzerland)	14	Bellinzona

== Nationalliga B ==
=== Teams, locations ===
Team	Based in	Canton	Stadium	Capacity
FC Aarau	Aarau	Aargau	Stadion Brügglifeld	9,240
FC Cantonal Neuchâtel	Neuchâtel	Neuchâtel	Stade de la Maladière	25,500
FC Étoile-Sporting	La Chaux-de-Fonds	Neuchâtel	Les Foulets / Terrain des Eplatures	1,000 / 500
FC Fribourg	Fribourg	Fribourg	Stade Universitaire	9,000
FC Grenchen	Grenchen	Solothurn	Stadium Brühl	15,100
FC Luzern	Lucerne	Lucerne	Stadion Allmend	25,000
ES FC Malley	Malley	Vaud	Centre sportif de la Tuilière	1,500
FC Nordstern Basel	Basel	Basel-Stadt	Rankhof	7,600
FC Mendrisio	Mendrisio	Ticino	Centro Sportivo Comunale	4,000
FC Schaffhausen	Schaffhausen	Schaffhausen	Stadion Breite	7,300
FC St. Gallen	St. Gallen	St. Gallen	Espenmoos	11,000
Urania Genève Sport	Genève	Geneva	Stade de Frontenex	4,000
FC Winterthur	Winterthur	Zürich	Schützenwiese	8,550
SC Zug	Zug	Zug	Herti Allmend Stadion	6,000

=== Final league table ===
Pos	Team	Pld	W	D	L	GF	GA	GD	Pts	Qualification or relegation
1	FC Fribourg	26	14	8	4	57	34	+23	36	NLB champions and promoted to 1952–53 Nationalliga A
2	FC Grenchen	26	16	3	7	78	40	+38	35	Play-off for promotion
3	SC Zug	26	14	7	5	52	34	+18	35	Play-off for promotion
4	FC Cantonal Neuchâtel	26	15	4	7	72	33	+39	34	
5	ES FC Malley	26	14	2	10	54	49	+5	30	
6	Urania Genève Sport	26	10	6	10	46	46	0	26	
7	Luzern	26	10	5	11	49	52	−3	25	
8	FC Winterthur	26	8	8	10	53	59	−6	24	
9	FC St. Gallen	26	8	7	11	65	51	+14	23	
10	FC Aarau	26	7	8	11	39	62	−23	22	
11	FC Schaffhausen	26	7	7	12	31	56	−25	21	
12	FC Étoile-Sporting	26	7	6	13	30	45	−15	20	
13	FC Mendrisio	26	6	5	15	38	75	−37	17	Relegated to 1952–53 1. Liga
14	FC Nordstern Basel	26	6	4	16	35	63	−28	16	Relegated to 1952–53 1. Liga

Source: RSSSF
Rules for classification: 1) Points; 2) Goal difference within the league, however with play-off for qualifiers;

=== Decider for second place ===
FC Grenchen and SC Zug ended the season level on points in joint second place. Therefore they had to contest a play-off for promotion. The decider match for second place was played on 15 June 1952 at Stadion Neufeld in Bern.

Team 1	Score	Team 2
FC Grenchen	1–0	SC Zug

FC Grenchen won the play-off and were promoted to 1952–53 Nationalliga A. SC Zug remained in the division for the next season.

== Attendances ==
No.	Club	Average
1	GCZ	11,769
2	Zürich	11,192
3	Young Boys	7,462
4	Servette	6,600
5	Lausanne	6,538
6	Basel	6,292
7	Bern	5,538
8	Young Fellows	4,808
9	La Chaux-de-Fonds	4,100
10	Biel-Bienne	3,854
11	Lugano	2,846
12	Locarno	2,685
13	Chiasso	2,500
14	Bellinzona	2,269

== Further in Swiss football ==
- 1951–52 Swiss Cup
- 1951–52 Swiss 1. Liga

== Sources ==
- Switzerland 1951–52 at RSSSF

Preceded by 1950–51	Nationalliga seasons in Switzerland	Succeeded by 1952–53
