= Hans Jordi =

Swiss footballer (1929–2019)

Personal information
- Full name: Hans Jordi
- Date of birth: 1929
- Place of birth: Switzerland
- Date of death: 25 March 2019 (aged 89–90)
- Position: Forward

Senior career*
Years	Team	Apps	(Gls)
1948–1949	Nordstern Basel	1	(0)
1954–1955	FC Basel	3	(0)
1957–1959	Concordia Basel	25	(1)
- * Club domestic league appearances and goals

Hans Jordi (1929 – 25 March 2019) was a Swiss footballer who played in the late 1940s and 1950s. He played mainly as a forward.

== Career ==
Jordi first played for Nordstern Basel. He joined FC Basel's first team for their 1954–55 season under player-coach René Bader. Jordi only played one season for the club. He made his domestic league debut for the club in the away game on 19 December 1954 as Basel drew 1–1 with Lausanne-Sport.

During his season with the club Jordi played seven games for Basel scoring one goal. Three games were in the Nationalliga A, one in the Swiss Cup and three were friendly games. He scored his sole goal during the test games.

Following his time with FC Basel Jordi moved on to play for Concordia Basel, who at that time played in the second tier in Swiss football.

== Death ==
Jordi died on 25 March 2019.

== Sources ==
- Die ersten 125 Jahre. Publisher: Josef Zindel im Friedrich Reinhardt Verlag, Basel. ISBN 978-3-7245-2305-5
- Verein "Basler Fussballarchiv" Homepage
