= Peter Rösch =

Swiss footballer (1930–2006)

Personal information
- Date of birth: 15 September 1930
- Place of birth: Biel-Bienne, Switzerland
- Date of death: 12 January 2006 (aged 75)
- Position: Defender

Senior career*
Years	Team	Apps	(Gls)
1948–1950	FC Biel-Bienne		
1950–1956	BSC Young Boys		
1956–1958	FC Lausanne Sport		
1958–1963	Servette FC		
1963–1964	Cantonal Neuchâtel		
1964–1966	FC Sion		
1966–1967	FC Monthey		

International career
1955–1962	Switzerland	5	(0)

Managerial career
- 1968–1970: FC Sion
- FC Martigny-Sports
- 1984–1988: FC Épalinges
- * Club domestic league appearances and goals

Peter Rösch (15 September 1930 – 12 January 2006) was a Swiss football defender who played for Switzerland in the 1962 FIFA World Cup. He also played for BSC Young Boys, Servette FC, and FC Sion. He later managed Sion, FC Martigny-Sports, and FC Épalinges.
