= Wim Lakenberg =

Dutch footballer

Personal information
- Date of birth: 19 April 1921
- Date of death: 19 May 1991 (aged 70)

International career
Years	Team	Apps	(Gls)
1947	Netherlands	1	(0)

Wim Lakenberg (19 April 1921 – 19 May 1991) was a Dutch footballer. He played in one match for the Netherlands national football team in 1947.
