= 1951–52 Swiss 1. Liga =

1. Liga
- Season: 1951–52
- Champions: 1. Liga champions: Wil; Group West: Yverdon-Sport; Group Cenral: Solothurn; Group South and East: Wil
- Promoted: Wil; Solothurn
- Relegated: Group West: Stade Lausanne; Group Central: Birsfelden; Group South and East: FC Trimbach; Uster
- Matches: 3 times 132 plus 3 play-offs and 3 play-outs

The 1951–52 1. Liga season was the 20th season of the 1. Liga since its creation in 1931. At this time, the 1. Liga was the third-tier of the Swiss football league system.

== Format ==
There were 36 teams competing in the 1. Liga this season. They were divided into three regional groups, each group with 12 teams. Within each group, the teams would play a double round-robin to decide their league position. Two points were awarded for a win and one point was awarded for a draw. The three group winners then contested a play-off round to decide the two promotion slots to the second-tier (NLB). The last placed team in each group were directly relegated to the 2. Liga (fourth tier). The second last placed team from each group then contested a play-out to decide the fourth and last relegation slot.

== Group West ==
=== Teams, locations ===
Club	Based in	Canton	Stadium	Capacity
FC Central Fribourg	Fribourg	Fribourg	Guintzet	2,000
CS International Genève	Geneva	Geneva		
CS La Tour-de-Peilz	La Tour-de-Peilz	Vaud	Stade de Bel-Air	1,000
US Lausanne	Lausanne	Vaud		
FC Martigny-Sports	Martigny	Valais	Stade d'Octodure	2,500
FC Montreux-Sports	Montreux	Vaud	Stade de Chailly	1,000
FC Forward Morges	Morges	Vaud	Parc des Sports	600
FC Sierre	Sierre	Valais	Complexe Ecossia	2,000
FC Stade Lausanne	Ouchy, Lausanne	Vaud	Centre sportif de Vidy	1,000
FC Thun	Thun	Bern	Stadion Lachen	10,350
Vevey Sports	Vevey	Vaud	Stade de Copet	4,000
Yverdon-Sport FC	Yverdon-les-Bains	Vaud	Stade Municipal	6,600

=== Final league table ===
Pos	Team	Pld	W	D	L	GF	GA	GD	Pts	Qualification or relegation
1	Yverdon-Sport FC	22	10	8	4	44	33	+11	28	To promotion play-off
2	FC Thun	22	10	7	5	53	34	+19	27	
3	Vevey Sports	22	12	3	7	44	38	+6	27	
4	FC Martigny-Sports	22	9	7	6	41	33	+8	25	
5	FC Sierre	22	8	7	7	52	43	+9	23	
6	US Lausanne	22	9	5	8	40	36	+4	23	
7	FC Forward Morges	22	8	7	7	33	36	−3	23	
8	CS International Genève	22	9	4	9	51	52	−1	22	
9	Central Fribourg	22	7	6	9	47	50	−3	20	
10	CS La Tour-de-Peilz	22	8	4	10	47	50	−3	20	
11	FC Montreux-Sports	22	4	8	10	43	64	−21	16	Play-out against relegation
12	FC Stade Lausanne	22	4	2	16	36	64	−28	10	Relegation to 2. Liga

Source: RSSSF
Rules for classification: 1) Points; 2) Goal difference within the league, but decider play-off for qualifiers.

== Group Central ==
=== Teams, locations ===
Club	Based in	Canton	Stadium	Capacity
FC Birsfelden	Birsfelden	Basel-Landschaft	Sternenfeld	9,400
SC Burgdorf	Burgdorf	Bern	Stadion Neumatt	3,850
FC Concordia Basel	Basel	Basel-Stadt	Stadion Rankhof	7,000
SC Derendingen	Derendingen	Solothurn	Heidenegg	1,500
FC Helvetia Bern	Bern	Bern	Spitalacker, Bern	1,000
SC Kleinhüningen	Basel	Basel-Stadt	Sportplatz Schorenmatte	300
FC Lengnau	Lengnau	Bern	Moos Lengnau BE	3,900
FC Moutier	Moutier	Bern	Stade de Chalière	5,000
FC Olten	Olten	Solothurn	Sportanlagen Kleinholz	8,000
FC Porrentruy	Porrentruy	Jura	Stade du Tirage	4,226
Saint-Imier-Sports	Saint-Imier	Bern	Terrain de Fin-des-Fourches	1,000
FC Solothurn	Solothurn	Solothurn	Stadion FC Solothurn	6,750

=== Final league table ===
Pos	Team	Pld	W	D	L	GF	GA	GD	Pts	Qualification or relegation
1	FC Solothurn	22	13	6	3	50	26	+24	32	To promotion play-off
2	FC Concordia Basel	22	14	3	5	55	28	+27	31	
3	FC Olten	22	10	7	5	46	30	+16	27	
4	SC Derendingen	22	6	11	5	28	25	+3	23	
5	FC Helvetia Bern	22	8	6	8	46	42	+4	22	
6	SC Kleinhüningen	21	8	5	8	38	34	+4	21	
7	FC Porrentruy	22	9	3	10	26	38	−12	21	
8	Saint-Imier-Sports	22	8	4	10	45	44	+1	20	
9	FC Lengnau	21	9	0	12	30	41	−11	18	
10	FC Moutier	22	7	4	11	28	38	−10	18	
11	SC Burgdorf	22	6	4	12	29	38	−9	16	Play-out against relegation
12	FC Birsfelden	22	6	1	15	30	66	−36	13	Relegation to 2. Liga

Source: RSSSF
Rules for classification: 1) Points; 2) Goal difference within the league, but decider play-off for qualifiers.

== Group South and East ==
=== Teams, locations ===
Club	Based in	Canton	Stadium	Capacity
FC Arbon	Arbon	Thurgau	Stacherholz	1,000
FC Baden	Baden	Aargau	Esp Stadium	7,000
FC Blue Stars Zürich	Zürich	Zürich	Hardhof	1,000
SC Brühl	St. Gallen	St. Gallen	Paul-Grüninger-Stadion	4,200
SV Ceresio Schaffhausen	Schaffhausen	Schaffhausen	Sportplatz Bühl	1,000
BSC Old Boys	Basel	Basel-Stadt	Stadion Schützenmatte	8,000
FC Red Star Zürich	Zürich	Zürich	Allmend Brunau	2,000
SC Schöftland	Schöftland	Aargau	Sportanlage Rütimatten	2,000
FC Trimbach|	Trimbach	Solothurn	Sportanlage Leinfeld	400
FC Uster|	Uster	Zürich	Sportanlage Buchholz	7,000
FC Wetzikon	Wetzikon	Zürich	Meierwiesen	2,000
FC Wil	Wil	St. Gallen	Sportpark Bergholz	6,048

=== Final league table ===
Pos	Team	Pld	W	D	L	GF	GA	GD	Pts	Qualification or relegation
1	FC Wil	22	19	1	2	82	18	+64	39	To promotion play-off
2	FC Red Star Zürich	22	16	3	3	57	23	+34	35	
3	FC Baden	22	11	3	8	37	27	+10	25	
4	FC Blue Stars Zürich	22	10	1	11	44	49	−5	21	
5	BSC Old Boys	22	10	1	11	37	45	−8	21	
6	FC Arbon	22	8	5	9	34	46	−12	21	
7	FC Wetzikon	22	7	5	10	35	39	−4	19	
8	SC Brühl	22	9	0	13	41	45	−4	18	
9	SV Ceresio Schaffhausen	22	7	4	11	36	46	−10	18	
10	SC Schöftland	22	6	6	10	41	53	−12	18	
11	FC Trimbach	22	6	5	11	38	56	−18	17	Play-out against relegation
12	FC Uster	22	5	2	15	27	62	−35	12	Relegation to 2. Liga

Source: RSSSF
Rules for classification: 1) Points; 2) Goal difference within the league, but decider play-off for qualifiers.

== Promotion, relegation ==
=== Promotion play-off ===
The three group winners played a single round-robin to decide the two promotion slots. The promotion play-offs were held on 22 and 29 June and 6 July 1952.

Pos	Team	Pld	W	D	L	GF	GA	GD	Pts	Qualification	WIL	SOL	YVE
1	Wil	2	1	1	0	1	0	+1	3	Champions and promoted	—	1–0	—
2	Solothurn	2	1	0	1	2	1	+1	2	Promoted	—	—	2–0
3	Yverdon-Sport	2	0	1	1	0	2	−2	1		0–0	—	—

Source: RSSSF
Rules for classification: 1) Points; 2) Head-to-head 3) Decider.

Wil are 1. Liga Champions and together with runners-up Solothurn were promoted to 1952–53 Nationalliga B. Yverdon-Sport remained in the division for the next season.

=== Relegation play-out ===
The three second last placed teams from each group contested a play-out to decide the fourth and final relegation slot. The matches in the play-outs were held on 22 and 29 June and 6 July 1952.

Pos	Team	Pld	W	D	L	GF	GA	GD	Pts	Qualification or relegation	MOS	BUR	TRI
1	Montreux-Sports	2	1	1	0	3	2	+1	3		—	0–0	—
2	Burgdorf	2	0	2	0	2	2	0	2		—	—	2–2
3	FC Trimbach	2	0	1	1	2	3	−1	1	Relegated to 2. Liga	2–3	—	—

Source: RSSSF
Rules for classification: 1) Points; 2) Head-to-head 3) Decider.

Montreux-Sports and Burgdorf remained in the division for the next season, FC Trimbach were relegated to 2. Liga.

== Further in Swiss football ==
- 1951–52 Nationalliga A
- 1951–52 Nationalliga B
- 1951–52 Swiss Cup

== Sources ==
- Switzerland 1951–52 at RSSSF

Preceded by 1950–51	Seasons in Swiss 1. Liga	Succeeded by 1952–53
