= Walter Beerli =

Swiss footballer (1928–1995)

Personal information
- Date of birth: 23 July 1928
- Place of birth: Switzerland
- Date of death: 1995 (aged 67)
- Position: Forward

Senior career*
Years	Team	Apps	(Gls)
- BSC Young Boys
- FC Luzern

International career
1950	Switzerland	1	(0)
- * Club domestic league appearances and goals

Walter Beerli (23 July 1928 – 1995) was a Swiss football forward who played for Switzerland in the 1950 FIFA World Cup. He also played for BSC Young Boys.

Beerli died in 1995, at the age of 67.
