= 1952–53 Swiss 1. Liga =

1. Liga
- Season: 1952–53
- Champions: 1. Liga champions: Thun; Group West: Yverdon-Sport; Group Cenral: Thun; Group South and East: SC Brühl
- Promoted: Thun; Yverdon-Sport
- Relegated: Group West: CS International Genève; Group Central: Old Boys; Group South and East: SV Ceresio Schaffhausen; FC Wetzikon
- Matches: 3 times 132 and 2 deciders plus 3 play-offs and 3 play-outs

The 1952–53 1. Liga season was the 21st season of the 1. Liga since its creation in 1931. At this time, the 1. Liga was the third-tier of the Swiss football league system.

== Format ==
There were 36 teams competing in the 1. Liga this season. They were divided into three regional groups, each group with 12 teams. Within each group, the teams would play a double round-robin to decide their league position. Two points were awarded for a win and one point was awarded for a draw. The three group winners then contested a play-off round to decide the two promotion slots. The last placed team in each group were directly relegated to the 2. Liga (fourth tier). The three second last placed teams were to contest a play-out to decide the fourth relegation slot.

== Group West ==
=== Teams, locations ===
Club	Based in	Canton	Stadium	Capacity
US Bienne-Boujean	Biel/Bienne	Bern		
FC Central Fribourg	Fribourg	Fribourg	Guintzet	2,000
CS International Genève	Geneva	Geneva		
CS La Tour-de-Peilz	La Tour-de-Peilz	Vaud	Stade de Bel-Air	1,000
US Lausanne	Lausanne	Vaud		
FC Martigny-Sports	Martigny	Valais	Stade d'Octodure	2,500
FC Montreux-Sports	Montreux	Vaud	Stade de Chailly	1,000
FC Forward Morges	Morges	Vaud	Parc des Sports	600
FC Sierre	Sierre	Valais	Complexe Ecossia	2,000
FC Sion	Sion	Valais	Parc des sports (Tourbillon)	8,000
Vevey Sports	Vevey	Vaud	Stade de Copet	4,000
Yverdon-Sport FC	Yverdon-les-Bains	Vaud	Stade Municipal	6,600

=== Final league table ===
Pos	Team	Pld	W	D	L	GF	GA	GD	Pts	Qualification or relegation
1	Yverdon-Sport FC	22	12	5	5	45	22	+23	29	To promotion play-off
2	FC Martigny-Sports	22	12	3	7	45	30	+15	27	
3	FC Sion	22	13	1	8	54	40	+14	27	
4	US Bienne-Boujean	22	10	4	8	44	39	+5	24	
5	FC Forward Morges	22	10	4	8	35	31	+4	24	
6	FC Sierre	22	8	7	7	33	35	−2	23	
7	Vevey Sports	22	8	6	8	37	25	+12	22	
8	CS La Tour-de-Peilz	22	7	4	11	45	54	−9	18	
9	Central Fribourg	22	5	8	9	39	55	−16	18	
10	FC Montreux-Sports	22	7	4	11	34	53	−19	18	
11	CS International Genève	22	6	5	11	37	47	−10	17	Play-out against direct relegation
12	US Lausanne	22	6	5	11	36	53	−17	17	Play-out against direct relegation

Source: RSSSF
Rules for classification: 1) Points; 2) Goal difference within the league, but decider play-off for qualifiers.

=== Decider for eleventh place ===
The decider was played on 14 and 21 June 1953.

Team 1	Score	Team 2
US Lausanne	1–0	CS International Genève
CS International Genève	2–4	US Lausanne

US Lausanne win and continue in the play-outs. CS International Genève are relegated directly to 2. Liga Interregional.

== Group Central ==
=== Teams, locations ===
Club	Based in	Canton	Stadium	Capacity
SC Burgdorf	Burgdorf	Bern	Stadion Neumatt	3,850
FC Concordia Basel	Basel	Basel-Stadt	Stadion Rankhof	7,000
SC Derendingen	Derendingen	Solothurn	Heidenegg	1,500
FC Helvetia Bern	Bern	Bern	Spitalacker, Bern	1,000
SC Kleinhüningen	Basel	Basel-Stadt	Sportplatz Schorenmatte	300
FC Lengnau	Lengnau	Bern	Moos Lengnau BE	3,900
FC Moutier	Moutier	Bern	Stade de Chalière	5,000
FC Nordstern Basel	Basel	Basel-Stadt	Rankhof	7,600
BSC Old Boys	Basel	Basel-Stadt	Stadion Schützenmatte	8,000
FC Porrentruy	Porrentruy	Jura	Stade du Tirage	4,226
Saint-Imier-Sports	Saint-Imier	Bern	Terrain de Fin-des-Fourches	1,000
FC Thun	Thun	Bern	Stadion Lachen	10,350

=== Final league table ===
Pos	Team	Pld	W	D	L	GF	GA	GD	Pts	Qualification or relegation
1	FC Thun	22	20	1	1	74	30	+44	41	To promotion play-off
2	FC Nordstern Basel	22	14	3	5	42	28	+14	31	
3	FC Concordia Basel	22	13	2	7	70	26	+44	28	
4	FC Lengnau	22	12	3	7	47	27	+20	27	
5	FC Helvetia Bern	22	7	5	10	28	42	−14	19	
6	Saint-Imier-Sports	22	8	3	11	33	52	−19	19	
7	FC Porrentruy	22	7	4	11	33	40	−7	18	
8	SC Burgdorf	22	5	7	10	38	54	−16	17	
9	SC Derendingen	22	7	3	12	31	49	−18	17	
10	SC Kleinhüningen	22	7	3	12	43	61	−18	17	
11	FC Moutier	22	7	2	13	36	42	−6	16	Play-out against relegation
12	BSC Old Boys	22	5	4	13	26	50	−24	14	Relegation to 2. Liga

Source: RSSSF
Rules for classification: 1) Points; 2) Goal difference within the league, but decider play-off for qualifiers.

== Group South and East ==
=== Teams, locations ===
Club	Based in	Canton	Stadium	Capacity
FC Arbon	Arbon	Thurgau	Stacherholz	1,000
FC Baden	Baden	Aargau	Esp Stadium	7,000
FC Blue Stars Zürich	Zürich	Zürich	Hardhof	1,000
SC Brühl	St. Gallen	St. Gallen	Paul-Grüninger-Stadion	4,200
FC Küsnacht	Küsnacht	Zürich	Sportanlage Heslibach	2,300
FC Mendrisio	Mendrisio	Ticino	Centro Sportivo Comunale	4,000
FC Olten	Olten	Solothurn	Sportanlagen Kleinholz	8,000
US Pro Daro	Bellinzona	Ticino	Campo Geretta / Stadio Comunale Bellinzona	500 / 5,000
FC Red Star Zürich	Zürich	Zürich	Allmend Brunau	2,000
SV Ceresio Schaffhausen	Schaffhausen	Schaffhausen	Sportplatz Bühl	1,000
SC Schöftland	Schöftland	Aargau	Sportanlage Rütimatten	2,000
FC Wetzikon	Wetzikon	Zürich	Meierwiesen	2,000

=== Final league table ===
Pos	Team	Pld	W	D	L	GF	GA	GD	Pts	Qualification or relegation
1	SC Brühl	22	13	7	2	46	18	+28	33	To promotion play-off
2	FC Blue Stars Zürich	22	13	5	4	55	29	+26	31	
3	US Pro Daro	22	11	5	6	39	38	+1	27	
4	FC Mendrisio	22	11	2	9	42	46	−4	24	
5	SC Schöftland	22	9	5	8	64	51	+13	23	
6	FC Olten	22	10	3	9	39	33	+6	23	
7	FC Red Star Zürich	22	9	4	9	32	27	+5	22	
8	FC Baden	22	6	10	6	41	39	+2	22	
9	FC Arbon	22	9	3	10	45	48	−3	21	
10	FC Küsnacht	22	9	3	10	30	43	−13	21	
11	FC Wetzikon	22	4	3	15	27	42	−15	11	Play-out against relegation
12	SV Ceresio Schaffhausen	22	1	4	17	20	63	−43	6	Relegation to 2. Liga

Source: RSSSF
Rules for classification: 1) Points; 2) Goal difference within the league, but decider play-off for qualifiers.

== Promotion, relegation ==
=== Promotion play-off ===
The three group winners played a single round-robin to decide the two promotion slots. The promotion play-offs were held 14 and 21 and 28 June 1953.

Pos	Team	Pld	W	D	L	GF	GA	GD	Pts	Qualification	THU	YVE	BRÜ
1	Thun	2	2	0	0	7	1	+6	4	Champions and promoted	—	—	5–1
2	Yverdon-Sport	2	1	0	1	2	2	0	2	Promoted	0–2	—	—
3	SC Brühl	2	0	0	2	1	7	−6	0		—	0–2	—

Source: RSSSF
Rules for classification: 1) Points; 2) Head-to-head 3) Decider.

Thun are 1. Liga Champions and together with runners-up Yverdon-Sport were promoted to 1953–54 Nationalliga B.

=== Relegation play-out ===
The three second last placed teams from each group contested a play-out to decide the fourth and final relegation slot. The matches in the play-outs were held on 21, 28 June and 5 July.

Pos	Team	Pld	W	D	L	GF	GA	GD	Pts	Relegation	MOU	USL	WZK
1	FC Moutier	2	1	1	0	4	2	+2	3		—	3–1	—
2	US Lausanne	2	1	0	1	4	5	−1	2		—	—	3–2
3	FC Wetzikon	2	0	1	1	3	4	−1	1	Relegated to 2. Liga	1–1	—	—

Source: RSSSF
Rules for classification: 1) Points; 2) Head-to-head 3) Decider.

FC Moutier und US Lausanne remained in the division, FC Wetzikon were relegated to 2. Liga.

== Further in Swiss football ==
- 1952–53 Nationalliga A
- 1952–53 Nationalliga B
- 1952–53 Swiss Cup

== Sources ==
- Switzerland 1952–53 at RSSSF

Preceded by 1951–52	Seasons in Swiss 1. Liga	Succeeded by 1953–54
