= Heinz Bigler (footballer, born 1925) =

Swiss footballer

Personal information
- Date of birth: 21 December 1925
- Place of birth: Bern, Switzerland
- Date of death: 20 June 2002 (aged 76)
- Position: Midfielder

Senior career*
Years	Team	Apps	(Gls)
1952–1962	BSC Young Boys		

International career
	Switzerland	10	(0)
- * Club domestic league appearances and goals

Heinz Bigler (21 December 1925 – 20 June 2002) was a Swiss football midfielder who played for Switzerland in the 1954 FIFA World Cup. He also played for BSC Young Boys.
