= Albert Sing =

German footballer (1917–2008)

Personal information
- Date of birth: 7 April 1917
- Place of birth: Eislingen, Kingdom of Württemberg, German Empire
- Date of death: 31 August 2008 (aged 91)
- Place of death: Origlio, Switzerland
- Position: Midfielder

Senior career*
Years	Team	Apps	(Gls)
1935	1. FC Eislingen		
1935–1948	Stuttgarter Kickers		
1940–1941	→ VfR Mannheim (Guest)		
1948–1949	TUlm 1846		

International career
1940–1942	Germany	9	(1)

Managerial career
- 1948: 1. FC Normannia Gmünd
- 1949–1951: SpVgg Ceresio Schaffhausen
- 1951–1964: BSC Young Boys
- 1962: Stuttgarter Kickers
- 1964–1966: Grasshoppers
- 1966–1967: VfB Stuttgart
- 1967–1968: 1860 Munich
- 1968–1970: St. Gallen
- 1970–1971: Lugano
- 1971–1974: FC Luzern
- 1974: Fribourg
- 1974–1975: VfB Stuttgart
- 1976: Chiasso
- 1977–1978: FC Luzern
- 1980: FC Zürich
- * Club domestic league appearances and goals

Albert Sing (7 April 1917 – 31 August 2008) was a German football player and manager. A midfielder, he played for 1. FC Eislingen, Stuttgarter Kickers, VfR Mannheim and TSG Ulm 1846 and capped twice for Germany.
