= Harry Koch (Swiss footballer) =

Swiss footballer (1930–2012)

Personal information
- Date of birth: 2 September 1930
- Place of birth: Switzerland
- Date of death: 23 April 2012 (aged 81)
- Place of death: Küsnacht, Switzerland
- Position: Defender

Senior career*
Years	Team	Apps	(Gls)
- FC Rapperswil-Jona
–1954	FC Zürich		
1955–1959	Grasshoppers		
1959–1961	FC Winterthur		

International career
1952–1959	Switzerland	9	(0)
- * Club domestic league appearances and goals

Harry Koch (2 September 1930 – 23 April 2012) was a Swiss footballer who played as a defender. He made nine appearances for the Switzerland national team from 1952 to 1959.
