= Marcel Flückiger =

Swiss footballer (1929–2010)

Personal information
- Date of birth: 20 June 1929
- Place of birth: Switzerland
- Date of death: 27 November 2010 (aged 81)
- Place of death: Bern, Switzerland
- Position: Defender

Senior career*
Years	Team	Apps	(Gls)
- BSC Young Boys

International career
1953–1959	Switzerland	4	(0)
- * Club domestic league appearances and goals

Marcel Flückiger (20 June 1929 – 27 November 2010) was a Swiss football defender who played for Switzerland in the 1954 FIFA World Cup. He also played for BSC Young Boys.
