= Charles Casali =

Swiss footballer (1923–2014)

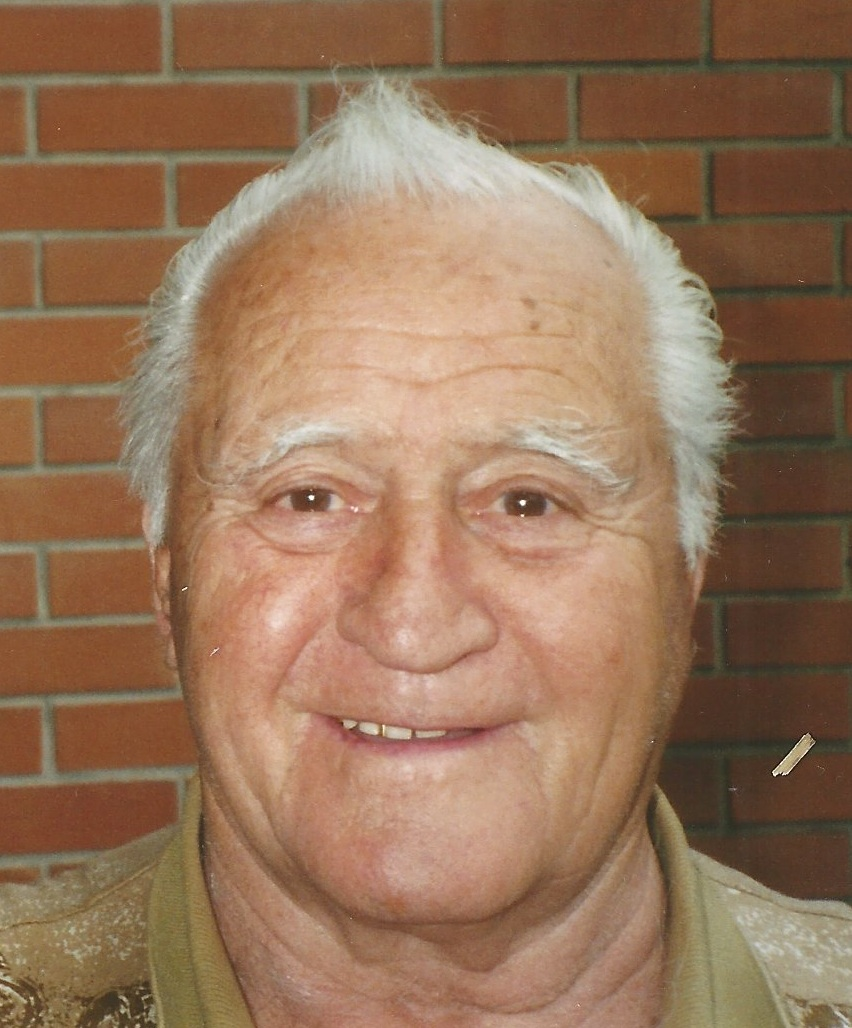

Personal information
- Date of birth: 27 April 1923
- Place of birth: Bern, Switzerland
- Date of death: 8 January 2014 (aged 90)
- Position: Midfielder

Senior career*
Years	Team	Apps	(Gls)
- BSC Young Boys

International career
1950–1956	Switzerland	19	(1)
Medal record
Representing Switzerland
FIFA World Cup
Third place	1954 Switzerland
- * Club domestic league appearances and goals

Charles "Schärlu" Casali (27 April 1923 – 8 January 2014) was a Swiss football midfielder who played for Switzerland in the 1954 FIFA World Cup. He also played for BSC Young Boys.
