= Gianfranco de Taddeo =

Swiss footballer (1928–2025)

Personal information
- Date of birth: 7 August 1928
- Place of birth: Switzerland
- Date of death: 29 January 2025 (aged 96)
- Position: Goalkeeper

Senior career*
Years	Team	Apps	(Gls)
1949–1950	La Chaux-de-Fonds	6	(0)
1950–1953	Young Boys	17	(0)
1953–1954	FC Basel	5	(0)
1954–1956	Cantonal Neuchatel	26	(0)
1956–1959	Old Boys		
1959–1961	Young Fellows Zürich	6	(0)
- * Club domestic league appearances and goals

Gianfranco de Taddeo (7 August 1928 – 29 January 2025) was a Swiss footballer who played as a goalkeeper in the 1950s.

== Biography ==
De Taddeo first played for La Chaux-de-Fonds in the 1949–50 Nationalliga A season. He then played three seasons for BSC Young Boys.

He then joined Basel's first team for their 1953–54 season under player-coach René Bader. After playing in seven test games, de Taddeo played his domestic league debut for his new club in the away game on 21 March 1953 as Basel were defeated 2–1 by Grenchen. In that one season that he was with the club, de Taddeo played a total of 13 games for Basel. Five of these games were in the Nationalliga A and eight were friendly games.

Following his season with Basel, de Taddeo moved on to play two seasons for Cantonal Neuchatel. He played three seasons for BSC Old Boys and then ended his active football career playing for Young Fellows Zürich.

De Taddeo died on 29 January 2025, at the age of 96.

== Sources ==
- Die ersten 125 Jahre. Publisher: Josef Zindel im Friedrich Reinhardt Verlag, Basel. ISBN 978-3-7245-2305-5
- Verein "Basler Fussballarchiv" Homepage
