= Robert Ballaman =

Swiss footballer (1926-2011)

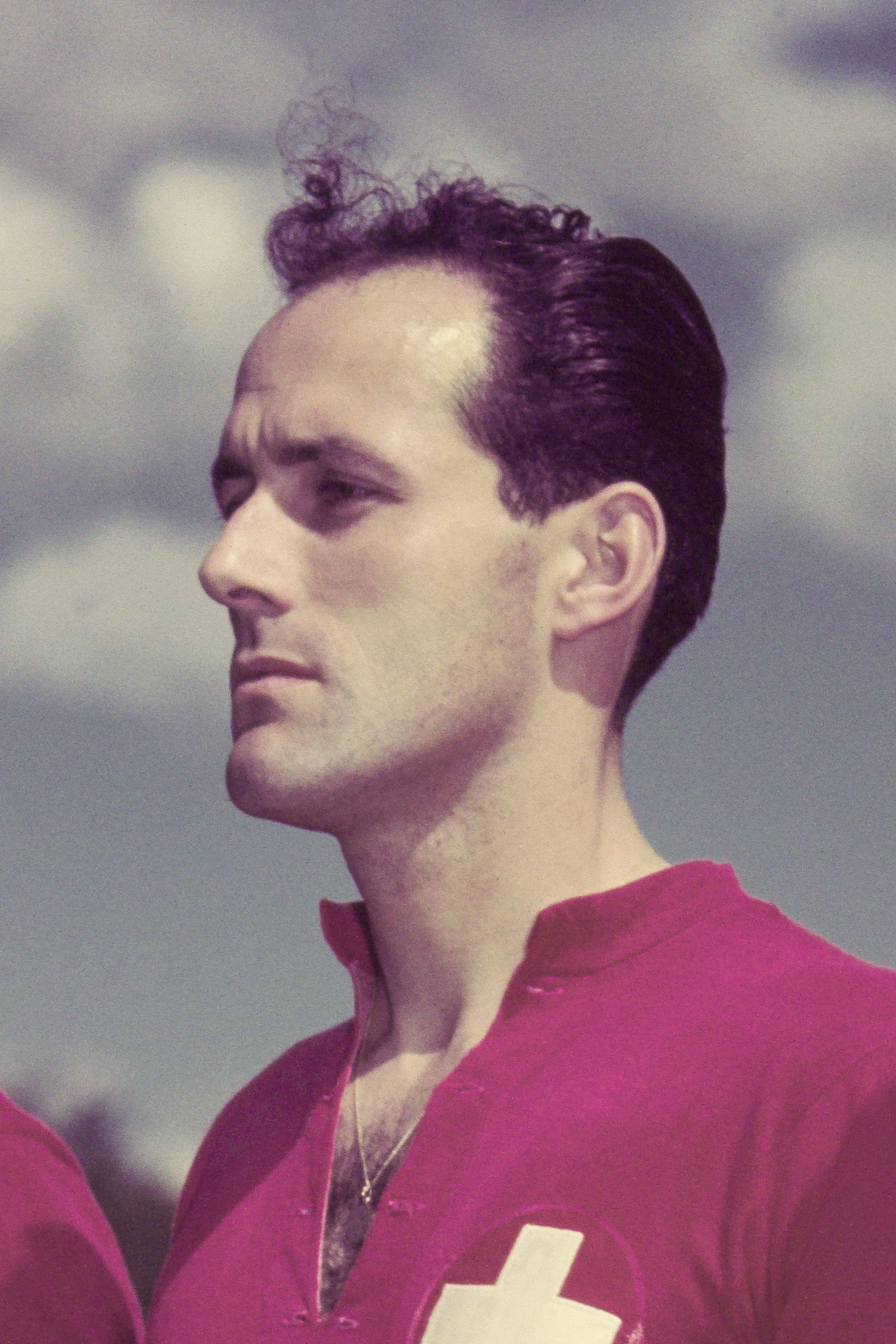

Personal information
- Date of birth: 21 June 1926
- Place of birth: Reconvilier, Switzerland
- Date of death: 5 September 2011 (aged 85)
- Place of death: Zurich, Switzerland
- Position: Centre forward

Senior career*
Years	Team	Apps	(Gls)
1941–1946	Reconvilier		
1946–1950	Biel-Bienne		
1950–1963	Grasshoppers		
1963–1964	Winterthur		
Total			(271)

International career
1948–1961	Switzerland	50	(19)
- * Club domestic league appearances and goals

Robert Ballaman (21 June 1926 – 5 September 2011) was a Swiss footballer who played as a centre forward.

== Career ==
Born in Reconvilier, Ballaman began playing football with FC Reconvilier at age 15. in 1946, he joined FC Biel-Bienne, where he would win the 1946–47 Nationalliga A title. He played a total of 14 seasons in the Nationalliga A with FC Biel-Bienne, Grasshopper Club Zürich and FC Winterthur, scoring 271 league goals.

Ballaman earned 50 caps and scored 18 goals for the Switzerland national football team. He played in the 1954 FIFA World Cup on home soil, where he scored 4 goals and Switzerland reached the quarterfinals.

== Club career ==
- 1944–1950: FC Biel-Bienne
- 1950–1963: Grasshopper Club Zürich
- 1963–1964: FC Winterthur

== Personal ==
Ballaman died at age 85 in September 2011.
