= 1957–58 Nationalliga A =

Swiss football season

Nationalliga A
- Season: 1957–58
- Champions: Young Boys
- Relegated: Winterthur; Biel-Bienne
- Top goalscorer: Ernst Wechselberger (Young Boys); 22 goals

Nationalliga B
- Season: 1957–58
- Champions: Zürich
- Promoted: Zürich; Luzern
- Relegated: ES Malley; Nordstern
- Top goalscorer: Werner Frey (Luzern); Werner Leimgruber (Zürich) both 22 goals

The following is the summary of the Swiss National League in the 1957–58 football season, both Nationalliga A and Nationalliga B. This was the 61st season of top-tier and the 60th season of second-tier football in Switzerland.

== Overview ==
The Swiss Football Association (ASF/SFV) had 28 member clubs at this time which were divided into two divisions of 14 teams each. The teams played a double round-robin to decide their table positions. Two points were awarded for a win, and one point was awarded for a draw. The top tier (NLA) was contested by the top 12 teams from the previous 1956–57 season and the two newly promoted teams Biel-Bienne and Grenchen. The champions would qualify for the 1958–59 European Cup and the last two teams in the league table at the end of the season were to be relegated.

The second-tier (NLB) was contested by the two teams that had been relegated from the NLA at the end of the last season, Zürich and Schaffhausen, the ten teams that had been in third to twelfth position last season and the two newly promoted teams Concordia and Sion. The top two teams at the end of the season would be promoted to the 1958–59 NLA and the two last placed teams would be relegated to the 1958–59 Swiss 1. Liga.

== Nationalliga A ==
=== Teams, locations ===
Team	Based in	Canton	Stadium	Capacity
FC Basel	Basel	Basel-Stadt	Landhof	4,000
AC Bellinzona	Bellinzona	Ticino	Stadio Comunale Bellinzona	5,000
FC Biel-Bienne	Biel/Bienne	Bern	Stadion Gurzelen	5,500
FC Chiasso	Chiasso	Ticino	Stadio Comunale Riva IV	4,000
Grasshopper Club Zürich	Zürich	Zürich	Hardturm	20,000
FC Grenchen	Grenchen	Solothurn	Stadium Brühl	10,900
FC La Chaux-de-Fonds	La Chaux-de-Fonds	Neuchâtel	Centre Sportif de la Charrière	10,000
FC Lausanne-Sport	Lausanne	Vaud	Pontaise	30,000
FC Lugano	Lugano	Ticino	Cornaredo Stadium	6,330
Servette FC	Geneva	Geneva	Stade des Charmilles	27,000
Urania Genève Sport	Genève	Geneva	Stade de Frontenex	4,000
FC Winterthur	Winterthur	Zürich	Schützenwiese	8,550
BSC Young Boys	Bern	Bern	Wankdorf Stadium	56,000
FC Young Fellows	Zürich	Zürich	Utogrund	2,850

=== Final league table ===
Pos	Team	Pld	W	D	L	GF	GA	GD	Pts	Qualification
1	Young Boys	26	20	3	3	76	37	+39	43	Swiss Champions qualified for 1958–59 European Cup and Swiss Cup winners
2	Grasshopper Club	26	16	3	7	81	47	+34	35	
3	Chiasso	26	15	5	6	56	43	+13	35	
4	La Chaux-de-Fonds	26	13	5	8	56	55	+1	31	
5	Grenchen	26	9	9	8	54	52	+2	27	
6	Lausanne-Sport	26	9	9	8	51	52	−1	27	
7	Young Fellows Zürich	26	10	5	11	57	54	+3	25	
8	Servette	26	10	4	12	50	47	+3	24	
9	Basel	26	9	6	11	59	53	+6	24	
10	Bellinzona	26	8	5	13	35	52	−17	21	
11	Lugano	26	7	6	13	36	47	−11	20	
12	Urania Genève Sport	26	7	4	15	38	55	−17	18	to play-out against relegation
13	Winterthur	26	6	6	14	51	76	−25	18	to play-out against relegation
14	Biel-Bienne	26	6	4	16	25	55	−30	16	Relegated to 1958–59 Nationalliga B

Source: rsssf.com

=== Results ===
Home \ Away	BAS	BEL	BB	CDF	CHI	GCZ	GRE	LS	LUG	SER	UGS	WIN	YB	YFZ
Basel		3–2	6–2	2–1	0–2	1–3	3–4	1–1	1–2	6–2	6–0	8–1	0–0	1–6
Bellinzona	3–2		0–2	0–1	1–2	3–5	1–1	0–1	1–0	1–0	3–4	3–1	1–2	3–2
Biel-Bienne	2–2	1–0		2–2	1–3	0–2	2–4	1–2	2–1	0–4	0–1	1–4	0–1	1–0
La Chaux-de-Fonds	1–0	3–0	1–1		2–2	3–2	3–4	2–5	2–1	2–0	3–2	6–2	2–1	3–2
Chiasso	1–1	0–2	2–0	3–0		4–2	1–1	2–1	2–2	3–2	2–3	2–1	1–3	1–0
Grasshopper Club	1–0	8–0	6–0	7–2	0–2		3–2	4–4	6–2	2–1	1–1	5–3	2–1	1–3
Grenchen	3–4	3–1	3–0	1–3	0–1	0–1		4–2	0–0	2–2	2–0	3–3	1–2	2–2
Lausanne-Sports	0–1	2–2	1–1	1–2	1–3	1–7	2–2		4–2	2–1	4–2	2–2	1–2	2–2
Lugano	2–0	1–1	1–2	4–1	3–3	1–0	2–4	0–1		1–0	1–0	4–0	1–1	2–3
Servette	2–2	2–2	2–1	1–0	4–3	1–3	4–0	2–2	2–0		3–0	7–1	1–4	3–2
Urania	3–2	1–2	2–0	3–1	1–3	2–3	1–1	1–2	0–0	0–2		2–2	0–2	3–4
Winterthur	2–2	0–1	0–2	4–4	2–3	3–2	2–2	1–3	3–2	2–0	3–1		2–3	2–3
Young Boys	6–2	4–1	2–1	1–2	5–1	4–4	6–3	4–3	6–1	3–1	2–1	4–3		5–1
Young Fellows	1–3	1–1	3–0	4–4	5–4	3–1	1–2	1–1	2–0	3–1	1–4	1–2	1–2	

Source: rsssf.com
Legend: Blue = home team win; Yellow = draw; Red = away team win.

=== Relegation play-out ===
Team 1	Score	Team 2
Urania Genève Sport	2–1	Winterthur

Urania Genève Sport won and remained in top-tier. Winterthur were relegated to 1958–59 Nationalliga B.

=== Topscorers ===
Rank	Player	Nat.	Goals	Club
1.	Ernst Wechselberger	(Germany)	22	Young Boys
2.	Raymond Duret	(Switzerland)	20	Grasshopper Club
3.	Miodrag Glišović	(Socialist Federal Republic of Yugoslavia)	19	Grenchen
4.	Norbert Eschmann	(Switzerland)	18	Grenchen
4.	Josef Hügi	(Switzerland)	18	Basel
6.	Eugen Meier	(Switzerland)	16	Young Boys
6.	Giuliano Robbiani	(Switzerland)	16	Grasshopper Club
8.	René Hamel	(Switzerland)	15	Grenchen
9.	Laurito Oscar	(Switzerland)	14	Chiasso
10.	Ferdinando Riva	(Switzerland)	13	Chiasso

== Nationalliga B ==
=== Teams, locations ===
Team	Based in	Canton	Stadium	Capacity
FC Bern	Bern	Bern	Stadion Neufeld	14,000
FC Cantonal Neuchâtel	Neuchâtel	Neuchâtel	Stade de la Maladière	25,500
FC Concordia Basel	Basel	Basel-Stadt	Stadion Rankhof	7,000
FC Fribourg	Fribourg	Fribourg	Stade Universitaire	9,000
FC Lengnau	Lengnau	Bern	Moos Lengnau BE	3,900
FC Luzern	Lucerne	Lucerne	Stadion Allmend	25,000
ES FC Malley	Malley	Vaud	Centre sportif de la Tuilière	1,500
FC Nordstern Basel	Basel	Basel-Stadt	Rankhof	7,600
FC Schaffhausen	Schaffhausen	Schaffhausen	Stadion Breite	7,300
FC Sion	Sion	Valais	Stade de Tourbillon	16,000
FC Solothurn	Solothurn	Solothurn	Stadion FC Solothurn	6,750
FC Thun	Thun	Bern	Stadion Lachen	10,350
Yverdon-Sport FC	Yverdon-les-Bains	Vaud	Stade Municipal	6,600
FC Zürich	Zürich	Zürich	Letzigrund	25,000

=== Final league table ===
Pos	Team	Pld	W	D	L	GF	GA	GD	Pts	Qualification or relegation
1	FC Zürich	26	18	4	4	92	44	+48	40	NLB Champions and promoted to 1958–59 Nationalliga A
2	FC Luzern	26	17	4	5	74	42	+32	38	Promoted to 1958–59 Nationalliga A
3	FC Cantonal Neuchâtel	26	15	5	6	52	28	+24	35	
4	FC Lengnau	26	13	7	6	66	38	+28	33	
5	FC Fribourg	26	12	6	8	54	30	+24	30	
6	FC Bern	26	11	8	7	50	43	+7	30	
7	FC Sion	26	12	5	9	46	50	−4	29	
8	Yverdon-Sport FC	26	11	4	11	48	48	0	26	
9	FC Thun	26	8	6	12	47	60	−13	22	
10	FC Concordia Basel	26	9	4	13	51	67	−16	22	
11	FC Solothurn	26	8	5	13	33	46	−13	21	
12	FC Schaffhausen	26	6	4	16	38	65	−27	16	
13	ES FC Malley	26	4	5	17	30	60	−30	13	Relegated to 1958–59 1. Liga
14	FC Nordstern Basel	26	3	3	20	36	96	−60	9	Relegated to 1958–59 1. Liga

Source: rsssf.com
Rules for classification: 1) Points; 2) Goal difference within the league, however with play-off for qualifiers;

== Further in Swiss football ==
- 1957–58 Swiss Cup
- 1957–58 Swiss 1. Liga

== Sources ==
- Switzerland 1957–58 at RSSSF

Preceded by 1956–57	Nationalliga seasons in Switzerland	Succeeded by 1958–59
