= 1959–60 Swiss Cup =

Tournament details
- Country: Switzerland

Final positions
- Champions: Luzern
- Runners-up: Grenchen

The 1959–60 Swiss Cup was the 35th season of Switzerland's football cup competition, organised annually since 1925–26 by the Swiss Football Association.

== Overview ==
This season's cup competition began with the games of the first round, played on the week-end of the 13 September 1959. The competition was completed on Sunday 8 May 1960, with the final, which was traditionally held at the former Wankdorf Stadium in Bern. The clubs from the 1959–60 Swiss 1. Liga were given a bye for the first round, they played in the second round on the week-end of 27 September. The clubs from this season's Nationalliga A (NLA) and from this season's Nationalliga B (NLB) were given byes for the first two rounds. These teams joined the competition in the third round, which was played on the week-end of 1 November.

The matches were played in a knockout format. In the event of a draw after 90 minutes, the match went into extra time. In the event of a draw at the end of extra time, a replay was foreseen and this was played on the visiting team's pitch. If the replay ended in a draw after extra time, a toss of a coin would establish the team that qualified for the next round. New this season was, that the cup winners qualified themselves for the first round of the Cup Winners' Cup in the next season. This would be the first season that this tournament took place for the winners of each European country's domestic cup competition.

== Round 1 ==
In the first phase, the lower league teams that had qualified themselves for the competition through their regional football association's regional cup competitions or their association's requirements, competed here. Whenever possible, the draw respected local regionalities. The first round was played on the weekend of 13 September 1959.

=== Summary ===
==== Region Ostschweiz ====
Team 1	Score	Team 2
13 September 1959
Kreuzlingen	3–2	FC Uzwil
FC Widnau	1–6	FC Rorschach
Vaduz	2–2 (a.e.t.)	FC Uznach
FC Bütschwil	1–3 (a.e.t.)	FC Weinfelden

Replay

Team 1	Score	Team 2
20 September 1959
FC Uznach	2–3 (a.e.t.)	Vaduz

==== Region Zürich ====
Team 1	Score	Team 2
13 September 1959
FC Bülach	3–0	FC Flurlingen
Polizei Zürich	1–1 (a.e.t.)	FC Oerlikon (ZH)
FC Küsnacht (ZH)	4–3	FC Altstetten (ZH)
FC Neumünster (ZH)	2–0	SV Seebach
FC Wollishofen	4–1	Uster
FC Wädenswil	3–2 (a.e.t.)	FC Wald (ZH)
FC Tössfeld	2–0	SC Veltheim

Replay

Team 1	Score	Team 2
20 September 1959
FC Oerlikon (ZH)	1–0	Polizei Zürich

==== Region Bern ====
Team 1	Score	Team 2
13 September 1959
Central Fribourg	4–2	Köniz
FC Madretsch (Biel)	2–3	FC Courtemaîche
Minerva Bern	4–0	FC Grünstern (Ipsach)
SC Aegerten-Brügg	1–2	FC Selzach
FC Kirchberg (BE)	5–2	FC Gerlafingen
20 September 1959
Dürrenast	2–6	FC Helvetia Bern

==== Region Solothurn ====
Team 1	Score	Team 2
13 September 1959
FC Klus-Balsthal	3–1	SC Kleinhüningen

==== Region Nordwestschweiz ====
Team 1	Score	Team 2
13 September 1959
FC Riehen	2–1	Black Stars
FC Breite (Basel)	5–0	FC Reinach (BL)

==== Region Aargau ====
Team 1	Score	Team 2
13 September 1959
Schöftland	2–4 (a.e.t.)	FC Oensingen
FC Gränichen	1–2	FC Muhen
FC Turgi	6–1	FC Schlieren

==== Region Innerschweiz ====
Team 1	Score	Team 2
13 September 1959
FC Südstern (Luzern)	2–6	Kickers Luzern
SC Zug	3–1	FC Brunnen

==== Region Ticino ====
Team 1	Score	Team 2
13 September 1959
Lamone Sportiva	3–1	FC Star (Mendrisio)
FC Cadenazzo	2–2 (a.e.t.)	AS Minusio

Replay

Team 1	Score	Team 2
20 September 1959
AS Minusio	5–2	FC Cadenazzo

==== Region Romande ====
Team 1	Score	Team 2
13 September 1959
CA Genève	1–2	Signal FC (Bernex)
Geneva GE	3–6	Chênois
FC Orbe	1–0 (a.e.t.)	FC Renens
Stade Lausanne	1–0	FC Chailly/Lausanne
FC Prilly	2–5	Montreux-Sports
FC Raron	3–1	FC Grône
FC Fétigny	8–1	FC Avenches
Neuchâtel Xamax	1–2	Le Locle-Sports
FC Fontainemelon	1–2	FC Hauterive

== Round 2 ==
The clubs from the 1959–60 Swiss 1. Liga were given a bye for the first round, they now joined the competition here, in the second round.

=== Summary ===
Team 1	Score	Team 2
27 September 1959
FC Sierre	12–0	FC Orbe
FC Versoix	5–4 (a.e.t.)	Signal FC (Bernex)
Stade Lausanne	3–0	Etoile Carouge
ES Malley	1–0	Chênois
Monthey	3–4 (a.e.t.)	FC Raron
Martigny-Sports	9–1	Montreux-Sports
FC Forward Morges	5–2	FC Fétigny
FC Kirchberg (BE)	3–1	US Bienne-Boujean
FC Stade Payerne	5–1	FC Oensingen
FC Selzach	1–4	Solothurn
Minerva Bern	2–0	FC Bözingen 34
Burgdorf	5–1	Central Fribourg
SC Derendingen	4–2	FC Helvetia Bern
FC Riehen	2–1 (a.e.t.)	FC Bassecourt
Old Boys	5–0	Le Locle-Sports
FC Breite (Basel)	0–2	Alle
Moutier	2–2 (a.e.t.)	FC Klus-Balsthal
Wettingen	6–2	FC Neumünster
Nordstern	1–0	FC Muhen
Concordia	4–3	FC Bülach
FC Wollishofen	1–3	FC Olten
Baden	4–0	FC Küsnacht (ZH)
FC Turgi	3–1	Emmenbrücke
FC Oerlikon	3–4 (a.e.t.)	FC Dietikon
Kreuzlingen	3–4	Red Star
FC Rorschach	1–0	SV Höngg
St. Gallen	4–0	FC Tössfeld
FC Wil	1–0	FC Weinfelden
Vaduz	4–1	Blue Stars
FC Rapid Lugano	5–2	Kickers Luzern
FC Wädenswil	2–0	Locarno
SC Zug	1–1 (a.e.t.)	Bodio
Bodio	2–1	SC Zug
Lamone Sportiva	0–2	FC Solduno
FC Hauterive	3–0	Delémont
FC Courtemaîche	0–1	FC Porrentruy
AS Minusio	4–2	FC Star (Mendrisio)

Replay

Team 1	Score	Team 2
11 October 1959
FC Klus-Balsthal (t)	4–4 (a.e.t.)	Moutier
25 October 1959
Bodio	2–1	SC Zug

(t): FC Klus-Balsthal qualified on toss of a coin

== Round 3 ==
The teams from the NLA and NLB entered the cup competition in this round. However, the teams from the NLA were seeded and could not be drawn against each other. Whenever possible, the draw respected local regionalities. The third round was played on the week-end of 1 of November.

=== Summary ===
Team 1	Score	Team 2
1 November 1959
Aarau	3–0	FC Wil
FC Riehen	0–6	Young Boys
SC Derendingen	0–1	Basel
Fribourg	8–1	ES Malley
FC Forward Morges	0–3	Lausanne-Sport
Minerva Bern	0–7	Grenchen
Urania Genève Sport	6–0	FC Stade Payerne
Cantonal Neuchâtel	3–2	Martigny-Sports
Winterthur	5–0	Vaduz
Lugano	1–2	Bodio
AS Minusio	0–3 *	Zürich
Chiasso	2–0	FC Dietikon
FC Rorschach	0–3	Brühl
Stade Lausanne	1–2	La Chaux-de-Fonds
Bellinzona	4–3	FC Solduno
FC Rapid Lugano	0–2	Grasshopper Club
Luzern	6–1	FC Wädenswil
Young Fellows	5–1	FC Turgi
Alle	3–0	FC Langenthal
Bern	7–1	Concordia
Wettingen	3–1	Schaffhausen
FC Klus-Balsthal	1–2	Thun
FC Raron	3–2	Vevey Sports
FC Hauterive	4–3 (a.e.t.)	Sion
Biel-Bienne	4–1	Old Boys
Lengnau	2–3	Nordstern
FC Sierre	1–2	Yverdon-Sport
FC Kirchberg	1–6	FC Porrentruy
Red Star	1–2	FC Olten
St. Gallen	4–1	Baden
Solothurn	1–2 (a.e.t.)	FC Versoix
Burgdorf	1–1 (a.e.t.)	Servette

- Note: The match Minusio–Zürich was played in Campo di Calcio Solduno, Locarno.

Replay

Team 1	Score	Team 2
11 November 1959
Servette	4–1	Burgdorf

=== Matches ===
1 November 1959

Aarau	3–0	FC Wil
Goal	FCA summary

Stadion Brügglifeld, Aarau

1 November 1959

FC Riehen	0–6	Young Boys
	YB summary	Goal

Sportplatz Grendelmatte, Riehen

1 November 1959
15:30

SC Derendingen	0–1	Basel
	FCB summary	21' (0:1) Stockbauer

Heidenegg, Derendingen
Attendance: 1,000
Referee: (Switzerland) Joseph Surdez (Delémont)

1 November 1959

AS Minusio	0–3	Zürich
	FCZ summary	38' (0:1) Leimgruber; 40' (0:2) Fäh; 47' (0:3) Pastega

Centro Sportivo La Morettina, Locarno
Attendance: 700
Referee: (Switzerland) Anton Bucheli (Luzern)

1 November 1959

Burgdorf	1–1 (a.e.t.)	Servette
Goal	Servette summary	Fatton

Stadion Neumatt, Burgdorf

11 November 1959
Replay

Servette	4–1	Burgdorf
Pázmándy; Mantula; Fatton; Steffanina	Servette summary	Goal

Stade des Charmilles, Geneva

== Round 4 ==
=== Summary ===
Team 1	Score	Team 2
28 November 1959
Urania Genève Sport	3–2	Cantonal Neuchâtel
29 November 1959
Aarau	0–3	Young Boys
Basel	5–2	FC Porrentruy
Fribourg	2–2 (a.e.t.)	Lausanne-Sport
FC Olten	2–7	Grenchen
Winterthur	8–1	Bodio
St. Gallen	1–6	Zürich
Chiasso	0–0 (a.e.t.)	Brühl
Bellinzona	0–1	Grasshopper Club
Luzern	3–2	Young Fellows
Alle	0–0 (a.e.t.)	Bern
Wettingen	2–7	Thun
FC Raron	5–1	FC Hauterive
Biel-Bienne	9–1	Nordstern
FC Versoix	2–5	Yverdon-Sport
Servette	ppd	La Chaux-de-Fonds

Replays

Team 1	Score	Team 2
9 December 1959
Lausanne-Sport	1–2	Fribourg
Brühl	0–3	Chiasso
Bern	2–0	Alle
Servette	0–0 (a.e.t.)	La Chaux-de-Fonds
16 December 1959
La Chaux-de-Fonds	2–2 (a.e.t.)	Servette
22 December 1959
La Chaux-de-Fonds	3–2 (a.e.t.) *	Servette

- Note: The third replay of a Chaux-de-Fonds–Servette was played at Wankdorf Stadium in Bern.

=== Matches ===
29 November 1959

Aarau	0–3	Young Boys
	FCA summary YB summary	Goal

Stadion Brügglifeld, Aarau

29 November 1959

Basel	5–2	FC Porrentruy
Frigerio 1' (1:0); Hügi (II) 44' (2:0); Weber 59' (3:0); Hügi (II) 70' (4:1); Frigerio 86' (5:2)	FCB summary	69' (3:1) Froidevaux; 82' (4:2) Brunner

Landhof, Basel
Attendance: 1,500
Referee: (Switzerland) Roger Staufer (Renens)

29 November 1959

St. Gallen	1–6	Zürich
Fritz Nef 88' (1:6)	FCZ summary	6' (0:1) Leimgruber; 20' (0:2) Wüthrich; 50' (0:3) Fäh; 62' (0:4) Wüthrich; 65' (0:5) Brizzi; 83' (0:6) Reutlinger

Espenmoos, St. Gallen
Referee: (Switzerland)

9 December 1959
Replay

Servette	0–0 (a.e.t.)	La Chaux-de-Fonds
	Servette summary

Stade des Charmilles, Geneva

16 December 1959
Replay

La Chaux-de-Fonds	2–2 (a.e.t.)	Servette
2x Fatton	Servette summary	Goal

Centre Sportif de la Charrière, La Chaux-de-Fonds

22 December 1959
Replay

La Chaux-de-Fonds	3–2 (a.e.t.)	Servette
Goal	Servette summary	Heuri; Németh

Wankdorf Stadium, Bern

== Round 5 ==
=== Summary ===
Team 1	Score	Team 2
26 December 1959
Biel-Bienne	0–1	Yverdon-Sport
27 December 1959
Fribourg	3–3 (a.e.t.)	Grenchen
Urania Genève Sport	1–0	Winterthur
Zürich	2–1	Chiasso
La Chaux-de-Fonds	1–0	Grasshopper Club
Luzern	4–1	Bern
FC Raron	ppd	Thun
Basel	1–1 (a.e.t.)	Young Boys

Replays

Team 1	Score	Team 2
3 January 1960
Thun	7–0	FC Raron
7 February 1960
Young Boys	5–3	Basel
14 February 1960
Grenchen	3–1	Fribourg

=== Matches ===
27 December 1959

Zürich	2–1	Chiasso
Wüthrich 67' (1:0); Pastega 71' (2:0)	FCZ summary	87' (2:1) Riva

Letzigrund, Zürich
Attendance: 6,000
Referee: (Switzerland) Fritz Schorer (Interlaken)

27 December 1959
14:30

Basel	1–1 (a.e.t.)	Young Boys
Hügi (II) 71' (1:1)	FCB summary YB summary	8' (0:1) Meier

St. Jakob Stadium, Basel
Attendance: 12,000
Referee: (Switzerland) Anton Helbling (Uznach)

7 February 1960
14:30
Replay

Young Boys	5–3	Basel
Meier 1' (1:0); Wechselberger 58' (2:2); Wechselberger 66' (3:2); Meier 80' (4:3); Wechselberger 88' (5:3)	FCB summary YB summary	14' (1:1) Weber; 32' (1:2) Frigerio; 79' (3:3) Hügi (II)

Wankdorf Stadium, Bern
Attendance: 7,500
Referee: (Switzerland) Josef Gulde St. Gallen

== Quarter-finals ==
=== Summary ===
Team 1	Score	Team 2
21 February 1960
Luzern	6–0	Thun
Young Boys	6–3	Urania Genève Sport
Grenchen	1–0	La Chaux-de-Fonds
Zürich	3–1	Yverdon-Sport

=== Matches ===
21 February 1960

Young Boys	6–3	Urania Genève Sport
Goal	YB summary	Goal

Wankdorf Stadium, Bern

21 February 1960

Zürich	3–1	Yverdon-Sport
Pastega 40' (1:1); Pasche 48' (o.g.); Leimgruber 88' (3:1)	FCZ summary	29' (0:1) Chevalley

Letzigrund, Zürich
Attendance: 4,000
Referee: (Switzerland) Roland David (Lausanne)

== Semi-finals ==
=== Summary ===
Team 1	Score	Team 2
18 April 1960
Luzern	3–1	Young Boys
Grenchen	2–2 (a.e.t.)	Zürich

Replays

Team 1	Score	Team 2
27 April 1960
Zürich	2–2 (a.e.t.)	Grenchen
4 May 1960
Grenchen	4–0	Zürich

=== Matches ===
18 April 1960

Luzern	3–1	Young Boys
Lüscher 54' (1:0); Wolfisberg 66' (2:1); Frey 86' (3:1)	YB summary	65' (1:1)

Stadion Allmend, Lucerne

18 April 1960

Grenchen	2–2 (a.e.t.)	Zürich
Raboud 14' (1:0); Hamel 61' (2:2)	FCZ summary	17' (1:1) Brizzi; 32' (1:2) Leimgruber

Stadium Brühl, Grenchen
Attendance: 11,000
Referee: (Switzerland) Karl Keller (Basel)

27 April 1960
Replay

Zürich	2–2 (a.e.t.)	Grenchen
Reutlinger 73' (1:1); Leimgruber 74' (2:1)	FCZ summary	55' (0:1) Dubois; (yellow card) 74' Karrer; 75' (2:2) Sidler

Letzigrund, Zürich
Attendance: 10,000
Referee: (Switzerland) Gottfried Dienst (Basel)

4 May 1960
Replay

Grenchen	4–0	Zürich
Morf (penalty missed) 25′ Morf (penalty missed) 26′ Reboud 32' (1:0); Dubois 35' (2:0); Spahr 48' (3:0); Hamel 79' (4:0)	FCZ summary

Wankdorf Stadium, Bern
Attendance: 11,000
Referee: (Switzerland) Viktor Schicker (Bern)

== Final ==
The final was held at the former Wankdorf Stadium in Bern on Sunday 8 May 1960.

=== Summary ===
Team 1	Score	Team 2
8 May 1960
Luzern	1–0	Grenchen

=== Telegram ===
8 May 1960
15:00

Luzern	1–0	Grenchen
Blättler 82' (1:0)	Fussball-Schweiz summary

Wankdorf Stadium, Bern
Attendance: 30,000
Referee: (Switzerland) Paul Wyssling (Zürich)

Luzern won the cup and this was the club's first cup title to this date.

== Further in Swiss football ==
- 1959–60 Nationalliga A
- 1959–60 Swiss 1. Liga

== Sources ==
- Fussball-Schweiz
- FCB Cup games 1959–60 at fcb-achiv.ch
- Switzerland 1959–60 at RSSSF

Preceded by 1958–59	Swiss Cup seasons	Succeeded by 1960–61
