= 1957–58 Swiss Cup =

Tournament details
- Country: Switzerland

Final positions
- Champions: Young Boys
- Runners-up: Grasshopper Club

The 1957–58 Swiss Cup was the 33rd season of Switzerland's football cup competition, organised annually since 1925–26 by the Swiss Football Association.

== Overview ==
This season's cup competition began with the games of the first round, played on the week-end of the 22 September 1957. The competition was to be completed on Sunday, 27 April 1958, with the final, which was traditionally held at the former Wankdorf Stadium in Bern. The clubs from the 1957–58 Swiss 1. Liga were given a bye for the first round, they joined the competition in the second round on the week-end of 6 October. The clubs from this season's Nationalliga A (NLA) and from this season's Nationalliga B (NLB) were given byes for the first two rounds. These teams joined the competition in the third round, which was played on the week-end of 3 November.

The matches were played in a knockout format. In the event of a draw after 90 minutes, the match went into extra time. In the event of a draw at the end of extra time, a replay was foreseen and this was played on the visiting team's pitch. If the replay ended in a draw after extra time, a toss of a coin would establish the team that qualified for the next round.

== Round 1 ==
In the first phase, the lower league teams that had qualified themselves for the competition through their regional football association's regional cup competitions or their association's requirements, competed here. Whenever possible, the draw respected local regionalities. The first round was played on the weekend of 22 September 1957.

=== Summary ===
Team 1	Score	Team 2
22 September 1957
FC Ems	1–3	FC Näfels
SC Goldach	1–5	FC Widnau
FC Uzwil	2–0	FC Fortuna St.Gallen
FC Amriswil	0–4	Frauenfeld
FC Wetzikon	4–1	FC Rapperswil
FC Dübendorf	0–3	FC Bülach
SC Veltheim	2–2 (a.e.t.)	FC Töss (Winterthur)
Polizei Zürich	3–0	FC Thalwil
FC Oerlikon (ZH)	5–2	FC Schwammendingen
FC Schlieren (ZH)	0–6	SV Seebach
FC Brunnen	3–3 (a.e.t.)	SC Zug
Luzerner SC	1–2	Kickers Luzern
Biaschesi	1–2	FC Solduno
FC Taverne	0–2	Lamone Sportiva
FC Subingen	2–1	FC Gerlafingen
FC Trimbach	3–2	FC Biberist
Black Stars	0–1 (a.e.t.)	FC Breite (Basel)
FC Riehen	1–3	FC Allschwil
FC Aesch	2–6	Dornach
FC Gränichen	3–2	FC Muhen
Wettingen	2–1	Wohlen
Etoile Carouge	4–1	Lancy-Sports
FC Versoix	3–5	Meyrin
Echallens	3–5 (a.e.t.)	Stade Lausanne
FC Crissier	0–2	FC Vallorbe
FC Assens	5–1	FC Châtel-St-Denis
Montreux-Sports	8–2	FC Villeneuve
FC Fétigny	5–2	Bulle
Comète Peseux	5–4	FC Estavayer-le-Lac
FC Fontainemelon	3–3 (a.e.t.)	Neuchâtel Xamax
FC Sonvilier	1–6	Le Locle-Sports
FC Tramelan	4–0	Laufen
FC Langnau im Emmental	8–4	WEF Bern
FC Lerchenfeld (Thun)	1–5	FC Helvetia Bern
Minerva Bern	1–4	FC Victoria Bern
SC Deitingen	0–6	FC Madretsch (Biel)

Replays

Team 1	Score	Team 2
29 September 1957
FC Töss (Winterthur)	4–0	SC Veltheim
SC Zug	2–3	FC Brunnen
Neuchâtel Xamax	4–2	FC Fontainemelon

== Round 2 ==
The clubs from the 1957–58 Swiss 1. Liga had been given a bye for the first round, they now joined the competition here, in the second round.

=== Summary ===
Team 1	Score	Team 2
6 October 1957
FC Uzwil	0–5	Brühl
Frauenfeld	2–1	FC Wil
FC Rorschach	4–1	FC Widnau
FC Oerlikon (ZH)	2–2 (a.e.t.)	Bodio
Uster	4–0	FC Näfels
FC Wetzikon	3–3 (a.e.t.)	Blue Stars
Bülach	0–3	Red Star
Baden	5–4	Polizei Zürich
St. Gallen	7–0	FC Töss (Winterthur)
FC Porrenrtruy	1–2	FC Helvetia Bern
Moutier	7–0	FC Peseux Comète (NE)
FC Victoria Bern	1–4	CS La Tour-de-Peilz
Neuchâtel Xamax	3–1	Delémont
FC Stade Payerne	2–3 (a.e.t.)	FC Madretsch (Biel)
FC Fétigny	0–6	FC Bassecourt
FC Langnau im Emmental	3–4	FC Olten
FC Langenthal	4–1	FC Allschwil
FC Subingen	0–2	Old Boys
SC Derendingen	4–0	FC Breite (Basel)
Dornach	0–4	SC Kleinhüningen
FC Trimbach	2–3	FC Birsfelden
Aarau	2–1	FC Gränichen
Wettingen	3–1	Burgdorf
Kickers Luzern	2–1 (a.e.t.)	Emmenbrücke
FC Brunnen	4–1	FC Rapid Lugano
Mendrisio	3–2 (a.e.t.)	FC Solduno
US Pro Daro	1–0	Lamone Sportiva
Locarno	4–3	SV Seebach
Le Locle-Sports	1–0	Central Fribourg
Meyrin	1–4	Vevey Sports
Montreux-Sports	3–2	CS International Genève
Etoile Carouge	2–1	FC Sierre
FC Vallorbe	0–9	Martigny-Sports
US Bienne-Boujean	5–3	FC Tramelan
Monthey	3–2	Stade Lausanne
FC Assens	5–1	FC Forward Morges

Replays

Team 1	Score	Team 2
6 October 1957
Bodio	4–1	FC Oerlikon (ZH)
Blue Stars	5–2	FC Wetzikon

== Round 3 ==
The teams from the NLA and NLB entered the cup competition in this round. However, the teams from the NLA were seeded and could not be drawn against each other. Whenever possible, the draw respected local regionalities. The third round was played on the week-end of 3 November 1957.

=== Summary ===
Team 1	Score	Team 2
2 November 1957
Basel	8–0	FC Olten
3 November 1957
Young Boys	2–1	Neuchâtel Xamax
Winterthur	5–1	Baden
Concordia	1–2	SC Kleinhüningen
Le Locle-Sports	1–2	Bern
FC Bassecourt	2–0	Solothurn
SC Derendingen	2–4	Grenchen
ES Malley	2–5	Vevey Sports
Fribourg	4–0	Montreux-Sports
FC Madretsch (Biel)	0–10	La Chaux-de-Fonds
Lausanne-Sport	5–1	Etoile Carouge
Servette	6–0	Martigny-Sports
Young Fellows	2–1	Red Star
Wettingen	0–5	Grasshopper Club
Biel-Bienne	4–0	FC Helvetia Bern
Thun	2–2 (a.e.t.)	US Bienne-Boujean
Urania Genève Sport	3–1	CS La Tour-de-Peilz
Sion	1–1 (a.e.t.)	Monthey
Luzern	3–2	Bodio
Cantonal Neuchâtel	2–2 (a.e.t.)	Moutier
FC Brunnen	4–2	Mendrisio
Lengnau	6–1	FC Langenthal
Nordstern	7–1	FC Birsfelden
Basel	8–0	FC Olten
Blue Stars	3–2	Brühl
Zürich	7–3	Uster
Chiasso	4–0	Locarno
US Pro Daro	0–2	Bellinzona
Frauenfeld	0–1	FC Rorschach
St. Gallen	1–0	Schaffhausen
FC Assens	1–8	Yverdon-Sport
Aarau	1–0	Old Boys
Kickers Luzern	1–1 (a.e.t.)	Lugano

Replays

Team 1	Score	Team 2
24 November 1957
US Bienne-Boujean	1–4	Thun
Monthey	1–3	Sion
Moutier	4–7	Cantonal Neuchâtel
Lugano	5–0	Kickers Luzern

=== Matches ===
2 November 1957
14:30

Basel	8–0	FC Olten
Borer 17' (1:0); Hügi (II) (penalty missed) 30′ Stäuble 38' (2:0); Müller 44' (3:0); Weber 51' (4:0); Weber 53' (5:0); Weber 87' (6:0); Weber 88' (7:0); Weber 89' (8:0)	FCB summary	(penalty missed) 50′

Landhof, Basel
Attendance: 2,000
Referee: (Switzerland) Pic (Le Noirmont)

3 November 1957

Young Boys	2–1	Neuchâtel Xamax
Goal	YB summary	Goal

Wankdorf Stadium, Bern

3 November 1957

Servette	6–0	Martigny-Sports
2x Eschmann; 2x Fatton; 1x Anker; 1x Pasteur	Servette summary

Stade des Charmilles, Geneva

3 November 1957

Zürich	7–3	Uster
Leimgruber 9' (1:0); Schneider 25' (2:0); Leimgruber 34' (3:1); Schneider 47' (4:2); Feller 60' (5:2); Leimgruber 69' (6:2); Leimgruber 71' (7:2)	FCZ summary	34' (2:1) Oertli; 36' (3:2) Schwander; 84' (pen.) Trachsler

Letzigrund, Zürich
Attendance: 1,100
Referee: (Switzerland) Adolf Fischlewitz (Basel)
- Uster played 1957 in the 1. Liga

3 November 1957

Aarau	1–0	Old Boys
Goal	FCA summary

Stadion Brügglifeld, Aarau

== Round 4 ==
=== Summary ===
Team 1	Score	Team 2
1 December 1957
FC Brunnen	1–1 (a.e.t.)	Winterthur
Lugano	5–0	Blue Stars
Thun	3–1	SC Kleinhüningen
Lengnau	2–0	Nordstern
Basel	1–2	Bern
FC Bassecourt	0–2	Grenchen
Vevey Sports	0–1	Fribourg
La Chaux-de-Fonds	0–2	Lausanne-Sport
Yverdon-Sport	1–3	Servette
Young Fellows	2–7	Grasshopper Club
Zürich	0–2	Chiasso
Bellinzona	4–0	FC Rorschach
Biel-Bienne	5–2	Sion
Urania Genève Sport	4–2	Cantonal Neuchâtel
Luzern	3–2	St. Gallen
4 December 1957
Young Boys	6–1	Aarau

Replay

Team 1	Score	Team 2
22 December 1957
Winterthur	0–1	FC Brunnen

=== Matches ===
1 December 1957
14:30

Basel	1–2	Bern
Oberer 62' (1:1)	FCB summary	18' (0:1) Schott; 63' (1:2) Casali (I)

Landhof, Basel
Attendance: 3,800
Referee: (Switzerland) Josef Gulde (St. Gallen)

1 December 1957

Yverdon-Sport	1–3	Servette
Goal	Servette summary	Anker; Eschmann; Pasteur

Stade Municipal, Yverdon-les-Bains

1 December 1957

Zürich	0–2	Chiasso
	FCZ summary	38' (0:1) Riva; 62' (0:2) Laurito

Letzigrund, Zürich
Attendance: 11,000
Referee: (Switzerland) Willy Rufli (Bremgarten)

4 December 1957

Young Boys	6–1	Aarau
Goal	YB summary FCA summary	Goal

Wankdorf Stadium, Bern

== Round 5 ==
=== Summary ===
Team 1	Score	Team 2
22 December 1957
Lugano	1–1 (a.e.t.)	Thun
Lengnau	2–1	Bern
Grenchen	5–1	Fribourg
Lausanne-Sport	2–1 (a.e.t.)	Servette
Grasshopper Club	1–1 (a.e.t.)	Chiasso
Bellinzona	1–0	Biel-Bienne
Urania Genève Sport	3–1	Luzern
29 December 1957
Young Boys	8–0	FC Brunnen

Replays

Team 1	Score	Team 2
29 December 1957
Thun (t)	2–2 (a.e.t.)	Lugano
Chiasso	1–2	Grasshopper Club

- Note: (t): Thun qualified on toss of a coin.

=== Matches ===
22 December 1957

Lausanne-Sport	2–1 (a.e.t.)	Servette
Goal	Servette summary	Fatton

Pontaise, Lausanne

29 December 1957

Young Boys	8–0	FC Brunnen
Goal	YB summary

Wankdorf Stadium, Bern

== Quarter-finals ==
=== Summary ===
Team 1	Score	Team 2
29 December 1957
Bellinzona	4–0	Urania Genève Sport
Lengnau	1–3	Grenchen
5 January 1958
Young Boys	5–1	Thun
Lausanne-Sport	4–4 (a.e.t.)	Grasshopper Club

Replay

Team 1	Score	Team 2
12 January 1958
Grasshopper Club	2–1	Lausanne-Sport

=== Matches ===
5 January 1958

Young Boys	5–1	Thun
Goal	YB summary	Goal

Wankdorf Stadium, Bern

== Semi-finals ==
=== Summary ===
Team 1	Score	Team 2
7 April 1958
Young Boys	7–2	Grenchen
Grasshopper Club	4–0	Bellinzona

=== Matches ===
7 April 1958

Young Boys	7–2	Grenchen
Meier 1' (1:0); Spicher 17' (2:0); Rey 20' (3:0); Meier 42' (4:0); Allemann 47' (5:0); Meier 54' (6:1); Bigler 75' (pen.)	YB summary	53' (5:1) René Hamel; 57' (6:2) Miodrag Glisovic

Wankdorf Stadium, Bern

7 April 1958

Grasshopper Club	4–0	Bellinzona
Duret 8' (1:0); Ballaman 30' (2:0); Ballaman 43' (3:0); Zurmühle 84' (4:0)	RSSSF summary

Hardturm, Zürich

== Final ==
The final was held at the former Wankdorf Stadium in Bern on Sunday 27 April 1958. The replay on Ascension Thursday 15 May.

=== Summary ===
Team 1	Score	Team 2
27 April 1958
Young Boys	1–1 (a.e.t.)	Grasshopper Club

Replay

Team 1	Score	Team 2
15 May 1958
Young Boys	4–1	Grasshopper Club

=== Telegram ===
27 April 1958
15:00

Young Boys	1–1 (a.e.t.)	Grasshopper Club
Rey 110' (1:0)	Fussball-Schweiz summary	113' (1:1) Duret

Wankdorf Stadium, Bern
Attendance: 32,000
Referee: (Switzerland) Josef Gulde (St. Gallen)

15 May 1958
15:00
Replay

Young Boys	4–1	Grasshopper Club
Schneiter 10' (1:0); Meier 25' (2:0); Allemann 32' (3:0); Wechselberger 67' (4:1)	Fussball-Schweiz summary	35' (3:1) Armbruster

Wankdorf Stadium, Bern
Attendance: 33,000
Referee: (Switzerland) Daniel Mellet (Lausanne)

Young Boys won the cup and this was the club's fourth cup title to this date. The team also won the league championship that season, so they completed their first domestic double.

== Further in Swiss football ==
- 1957–58 Nationalliga A
- 1957–58 Swiss 1. Liga

== Sources ==
- Fussball-Schweiz
- FCB Cup games 1957–58 at fcb-achiv.ch
- Switzerland 1957–58 at RSSSF

Preceded by 1956–57	Swiss Cup seasons	Succeeded by 1958–59
