= 1956–57 Nationalliga A =

Swiss football season

Nationalliga A
- Season: 1956–57
- Champions: Young Boys
- Relegated: Zürich; Schaffhausen
- Top goalscorer: Adrien Kauer (La Chaux-de-Fonds); 29 goals

Nationalliga B
- Season: 1956–57
- Champions: Biel-Bienne
- Promoted: Biel-Bienne; Grenchen
- Relegated: St. Gallen; Brühl
- Top goalscorer: Walter Beerli (Luzern); Günter Sosna (Cantonal); 22 goals

The following is the summary of the Swiss National League in the 1956–57 football season, both Nationalliga A and Nationalliga B. This was the 60th season of top-tier and the 59th season of second-tier football in Switzerland.

== Overview ==
The Swiss Football Association (ASF/SFV) had 28 member clubs at this time which were divided into two divisions of 14 teams each. The teams played a double round-robin to decide their table positions. Two points were awarded for a win and one point was awarded for a draw. The top tier (NLA) was contested by the top 12 teams from the previous 1955–56 season and the two newly promoted teams Winterthur and Young Fellows. The champions would qualify for the 1957–58 European Cup and the last two teams in the league table at the end of the season were to be relegated.

The second-tier (NLB) was contested by the two teams that had been relegated from the NLA at the end of the last season, these were Grenchen and Fribourg, the ten teams that had been in third to twelfth position last season and the two newly promoted teams Brühl and Yverdon-Sport. The top two teams at the end of the season would be promoted to the 1957–58 NLA and the two last placed teams would be relegated to the 1957–58 Swiss 1. Liga.

== Nationalliga A ==
=== Teams, locations ===
Team	Based in	Canton	Stadium	Capacity
FC Basel	Basel	Basel-Stadt	Landhof	4,000
AC Bellinzona	Bellinzona	Ticino	Stadio Comunale Bellinzona	5,000
FC Chiasso	Chiasso	Ticino	Stadio Comunale Riva IV	4,000
Grasshopper Club Zürich	Zürich	Zürich	Hardturm	20,000
FC La Chaux-de-Fonds	La Chaux-de-Fonds	Neuchâtel	Centre Sportif de la Charrière	10,000
FC Lausanne-Sport	Lausanne	Vaud	Pontaise	30,000
FC Lugano	Lugano	Ticino	Cornaredo Stadium	6,330
FC Schaffhausen	Schaffhausen	Schaffhausen	Stadion Breite	7,300
Servette FC	Geneva	Geneva	Stade des Charmilles	27,000
Urania Genève Sport	Genève	Geneva	Stade de Frontenex	4,000
FC Winterthur	Winterthur	Zürich	Schützenwiese	8,550
BSC Young Boys	Bern	Bern	Wankdorf Stadium	56,000
FC Young Fellows	Zürich	Zürich	Utogrund	2,850
FC Zürich	Zürich	Zürich	Letzigrund	25,000

=== Final league table ===
Pos	Team	Pld	W	D	L	GF	GA	GD	Pts	Qualification or relegation
1	Young Boys	26	21	3	2	76	22	+54	45	Swiss Champions qualified for 1957–58 European Cup
2	Grasshopper Club	26	19	3	4	82	30	+52	41	
3	La Chaux-de-Fonds	26	17	4	5	87	35	+52	38	Swiss Cup winners
4	Basel	26	15	4	7	53	38	+15	34	
5	Urania Genève Sport	26	12	6	8	38	34	+4	30	
6	Bellinzona	26	10	8	8	37	42	−5	28	
7	Lausanne-Sport	26	11	5	10	44	37	+7	27	
8	Servette	26	9	8	9	40	44	−4	26	
9	Chiasso	26	10	5	11	46	62	−16	25	
10	Lugano	26	6	5	15	39	51	−12	17	
11	Winterthur	26	6	4	16	43	67	−24	16	
12	Young Fellows Zürich	26	4	6	16	30	67	−37	14	to play-out against relegation
13	Zürich	26	5	4	17	34	61	−27	14	to play-out against relegation
14	Schaffhausen	26	1	7	18	26	85	−59	9	Relegated to 1957–58 Nationalliga B

Source: rsssf.com
Rules for classification: 1) Points; 2) Goal difference within the league, however with play-off for qualifiers;

=== Results ===
Home \ Away	BAS	BEL	CDF	CHI	GCZ	LS	LUG	SHA	SER	UGS	WIN	YB	YFZ	ZÜR
Basel		3–0	4–3	3–0	1–3	1–0	3–0	4–1	0–0	2–1	3–2	3–4	3–1	3–0
Bellinzona	3–1		1–1	2–0	1–0	0–0	1–0	2–0	2–4	2–1	0–0	1–1	2–1	2–2
La Chaux-de-Fonds	2–3	3–0		1–0	4–2	5–2	7–2	4–0	4–1	4–0	5–2	2–0	4–0	6–2
Chiasso	1–1	3–2	1–4		1–2	1–1	3–2	2–2	1–1	3–1	3–1	0–8	5–0	2–1
Grasshopper Club	1–0	7–2	2–2	8–1		4–2	3–2	9–0	1–1	1–2	5–1	2–0	2–2	2–1
Lausanne-Sports	7–1	0–1	3–2	1–0	1–2		3–2	3–0	2–0	2–2	3–1	0–1	3–1	1–2
Lugano	1–1	0–0	1–0	4–1	1–2	3–0		6–0	3–1	0–0	2–3	0–2	3–1	1–3
Schaffhausen	0–2	0–4	1–5	3–4	0–5	1–3	1–1		1–1	0–2	1–4	2–6	1–1	1–1
Servette	1–0	4–0	2–2	2–2	1–5	0–2	2–2	3–1		1–2	4–3	0–2	1–0	2–1
Urania Genève Sport	1–0	3–1	0–0	4–0	0–2	2–0	1–0	1–1	2–1		1–1	0–1	5–3	3–0
Winterthur	0–1	2–3	1–3	2–5	0–4	2–3	2–0	6–2	1–1	2–1		0–2	2–3	2–0
Young Boys	2–2	2–1	4–3	4–0	2–0	0–0	5–1	3–2	2–0	5–0	7–1		5–1	2–0
Young Fellows Zürich	0–3	2–2	0–5	2–4	1–6	2–1	3–1	2–2	1–2	1–1	1–1	0–1		0–2
Zürich	3–5	1–1	1–6	0–3	1–2	1–1	3–1	1–2	2–4	1–2	4–1	1–5	0–1	

Source: rsssf.com
Legend: Blue = home team win; Yellow = draw; Red = away team win.

=== Relegation play-out ===
FC Zürich and Young Fellows Zürich finished level on points in joint twelfth position. Therefore, it required a play-out against relegation and for twelfth position. This took place on 23 June 1957 at the Hardturm in Zürich.

Team 1	Score	Team 2
Young Fellows	2–1 (a.e.t.)	Zürich

Young Fellows won and remained in the top-tier. Zürich were relegated to 1957–58 Nationalliga B.

=== Topscorers ===
Rank	Player	Nat.	Goals	Club
1.	Adrien Kauer	(Switzerland)	29	La Chaux-de-Fonds
2.	Branislav Vukosavljević	(Socialist Federal Republic of Yugoslavia)	26	Grasshopper Club
3.	Josef Hügi	(Switzerland)	22	Basel
4.	Eugen Meier	(Switzerland)	18	Young Boys
5.	Raymond Duret	(Switzerland)	17	Grasshopper Club
6.	Arturo Capoferri	(Switzerland)	16	Bellinzona
6.	Charles Antenen	(Switzerland)	16	La Chaux-de-Fonds
6.	René Hamel	(Switzerland)	16	Young Boys
6.	Robert Ballaman	(Switzerland)	16	Grasshopper Club
10.	Raymond Morand	(Switzerland)	14	La Chaux-de-Fonds

== Nationalliga B ==
=== Teams, locations ===
Team	Based in	Canton	Stadium	Capacity
FC Bern	Bern	Bern	Stadion Neufeld	14,000
FC Biel-Bienne	Biel/Bienne	Bern	Stadion Gurzelen	5,500
SC Brühl	St. Gallen	St. Gallen	Paul-Grüninger-Stadion	4,200
FC Cantonal Neuchâtel	Neuchâtel	Neuchâtel	Stade de la Maladière	25,500
FC Fribourg	Fribourg	Fribourg	Stade Universitaire	9,000
FC Grenchen	Grenchen	Solothurn	Stadium Brühl	10,900
FC Lengnau	Lengnau	Bern	Moos Lengnau BE	3,900
FC Luzern	Lucerne	Lucerne	Stadion Allmend	25,000
ES FC Malley	Malley	Vaud	Centre sportif de la Tuilière	1,500
FC Nordstern Basel	Basel	Basel-Stadt	Rankhof	7,600
FC Solothurn	Solothurn	Solothurn	Stadion FC Solothurn	6,750
FC St. Gallen	St. Gallen	St. Gallen	Espenmoos	11,000
FC Thun	Thun	Bern	Stadion Lachen	10,350
Yverdon-Sport FC	Yverdon-les-Bains	Vaud	Stade Municipal	6,600

=== Final league table ===
Pos	Team	Pld	W	D	L	GF	GA	GD	Pts	Qualification or relegation
1	FC Biel-Bienne	26	18	4	4	64	25	+39	40	To play-off for title
2	FC Grenchen	26	19	2	5	73	34	+39	40	To play-off for title
3	FC Fribourg	26	10	11	5	47	27	+20	31	
4	FC Solothurn	26	12	5	9	31	40	−9	29	
5	Yverdon-Sport FC	26	11	6	9	53	46	+7	28	
6	FC Cantonal Neuchâtel	26	10	7	9	41	46	−5	27	
7	FC Luzern	26	11	4	11	47	43	+4	26	
8	ES FC Malley	26	10	6	10	49	50	−1	26	
9	FC Nordstern Basel	26	8	8	10	45	48	−3	24	
10	FC Thun	26	9	4	13	45	48	−3	22	
11	FC Lengnau	26	8	6	12	38	55	−17	22	
12	FC Bern	26	6	7	13	29	33	−4	19	to play-out against relegation
13	FC St. Gallen	26	5	9	12	27	43	−16	19	to play-out against relegation
14	SC Brühl	26	4	3	19	23	74	−51	11	Relegated to 1957–58 1. Liga

Source: rsssf
Rules for classification: 1) Points; 2) Goal difference within the league, however with play-off for qualifiers;

=== Play-off for title ===
FC Biel-Bienne and FC Grenchen finished level on points in joint first position and had both achieved promotion to 1957–58 Nationalliga A. However, it required a play-off to decide the title as NLB champions and this took place on 23 June 1957 at the Stadion Neufeld in Bern.

Team 1	Score	Team 2
Biel-Bienne	3–1	Grenchen

Biel-Bienne won the NLB championship.

=== Relegation play-out ===
FC Bern and FC St. Gallen finished level on points in joint twelfth position. Therefore, it required a play-out against relegation and for twelfth position. This took place on 23 June 1957 at the Hardturm in Zürich.

Team 1	Score	Team 2
Bern	1–1 (a.e.t.)	FC St. Gallen

Due to the egality a replay was required and this was played on 30 June at the Stadion Allmend in Luzern.

Team 1	Score	Team 2
Bern	2–1	St. Gallen

Bern won and remained in the second-tier. St. Gallen were relegated to 1957–58 1. Liga.

== Further in Swiss football ==
- 1956–57 Swiss Cup
- 1956–57 Swiss 1. Liga

== Sources ==
- Switzerland 1956–57 at RSSSF

Preceded by 1955–56	Nationalliga seasons in Switzerland	Succeeded by 1957–58
