= 1958–59 Nationalliga A =

Swiss football season

Nationalliga A
- Season: 1958–59
- Champions: Young Boys
- Relegated: Urania Genève Sport; Young Fellows
- Top goalscorer: Eugen Meier (Young Boys); 24 goals

Nationalliga B
- Season: 1958–59
- Champions: Winterthur
- Promoted: Winterthur; Biel-Bienne
- Relegated: Concordia; Solothurn
- Top goalscorer: Edgar Graf (Biel-Bienne); 23 goals

The following is the summary of the Swiss National League in the 1958–59 football season, both Nationalliga A and Nationalliga B. This was the 62nd season of top-tier and the 61st season of second-tier football in Switzerland.

== Overview ==
The Swiss Football Association (ASF/SFV) had 28 member clubs at this time which were divided into two divisions of 14 teams each. The teams played a double round-robin to decide their table positions. Two points were awarded for a win and one point was awarded for a draw. The top tier (NLA) was contested by the top 12 teams from the previous 1957–58 season and the two newly promoted teams Zürich and Luzern. The champions would qualify for the 1959–60 European Cup and the last two teams in the league table at the end of the season were to be relegated.

The second-tier (NLB) was contested by the two teams that had been relegated from the NLA at the end of the last season, Winterthur and Biel-Bienne, the ten teams that had been in third to twelfth position last season and the two newly promoted teams Vevey-Sports and Aarau. The top two teams at the end of the season would be promoted to the 1959–60 NLA and the two last placed teams would be relegated to the 1959–60 Swiss 1. Liga.

== Nationalliga A ==
=== Teams, locations ===
Team	Based in	Canton	Stadium	Capacity
FC Basel	Basel	Basel-Stadt	Landhof	4,000
AC Bellinzona	Bellinzona	Ticino	Stadio Comunale Bellinzona	5,000
FC Chiasso	Chiasso	Ticino	Stadio Comunale Riva IV	4,000
Grasshopper Club Zürich	Zürich	Zürich	Hardturm	20,000
FC Grenchen	Grenchen	Solothurn	Stadium Brühl	10,900
FC La Chaux-de-Fonds	La Chaux-de-Fonds	Neuchâtel	Centre Sportif de la Charrière	10,000
FC Lausanne-Sport	Lausanne	Vaud	Pontaise	30,000
FC Lugano	Lugano	Ticino	Cornaredo Stadium	6,330
FC Luzern	Lucerne	Lucerne	Stadion Allmend	25,000
Servette FC	Geneva	Geneva	Stade des Charmilles	27,000
Urania Genève Sport	Genève	Geneva	Stade de Frontenex	4,000
BSC Young Boys	Bern	Bern	Wankdorf Stadium	56,000
FC Young Fellows	Zürich	Zürich	Utogrund	2,850
FC Zürich	Zürich	Zürich	Letzigrund	25,000

=== Final league table ===
Pos	Team	Pld	W	D	L	GF	GA	GD	Pts	Qualification
1	Young Boys	26	16	6	4	79	42	+37	38	Swiss Champions qualified for 1959–60 European Cup
2	Grenchen	26	12	8	6	57	39	+18	32	Swiss Cup winners
3	Zürich	26	14	2	10	55	45	+10	30	
4	Grasshopper Club	26	12	6	8	63	54	+9	30	
5	Lausanne-Sport	26	11	7	8	40	41	−1	29	
6	Basel	26	11	5	10	54	48	+6	27	
7	La Chaux-de-Fonds	26	8	10	8	44	44	0	26	
8	Luzern	26	8	10	8	40	45	−5	26	
9	Servette	26	10	4	12	70	58	+12	24	
10	FC Chiasso	26	10	4	12	48	61	−13	24	
11	Lugano	26	6	11	9	27	33	−6	23	
12	Bellinzona	26	8	6	12	38	57	−19	22	
13	Urania Genève Sport	26	6	7	13	41	50	−9	19	Relegated to 1959–60 Nationalliga B
14	Young Fellows Zürich	26	5	4	17	33	72	−39	14	Relegated to 1959–60 Nationalliga B

Source: rsssf.com
Rules for classification: 1) Points; 2) Goal difference within the league, however with play-off for qualifiers;

=== Results ===
Home \ Away	BAS	BEL	CDF	CHI	GCZ	GRE	LS	LUG	LUZ	SER	UGS	YB	YFZ	ZÜR
Basel		6–1	1–3	0–0	2–4	1–4	4–0	2–2	2–2	0–3	2–2	2–3	5–2	2–1
Bellinzona	0–0		2–0	2–3	3–3	5–2	1–1	1–0	0–0	3–2	1–0	3–2	2–1	2–1
La Chaux-de-Fonds	2–1	3–1		1–1	1–3	2–0	1–1	0–1	2–2	3–2	5–1	2–3	2–2	0–1
Chiasso	1–2	4–1	1–1		3–0	1–3	3–2	2–1	2–5	4–3	0–3	2–6	3–2	3–1
Grasshopper Club	1–2	2–0	1–3	6–0		4–5	5–1	2–2	2–2	0–0	2–2	4–4	3–1	3–2
Grenchen	6–2	1–1	6–3	1–3	3–1		0–0	0–0	4–0	1–3	0–0	2–2	3–1	1–1
Lausanne-Sports	0–5	4–0	3–3	6–2	0–1	0–2		1–0	0–3	2–0	1–0	1–4	3–0	1–0
Lugano	0–1	2–2	0–0	1–0	3–2	1–1	0–0		0–0	0–2	1–1	3–1	0–0	4–1
Luzern	2–4	3–2	0–0	1–1	1–3	1–3	1–1	2–0		4–0	3–2	2–1	1–3	0–0
Servette	3–4	5–1	2–3	3–5	2–3	3–1	2–4	2–2	6–1		4–3	2–3	9–2	3–1
Urania	1–3	3–0	0–0	4–1	1–2	0–2	2–3	3–0	0–1	3–3		2–2	4–0	1–5
Young Boys	1–0	3–0	4–1	3–2	3–1	2–2	1–1	3–1	3–0	2–2	5–0		4–0	6–2
Young Fellows	1–0	3–2	1–1	1–0	3–4	0–4	0–2	3–1	1–1	1–3	2–3	0–6		1–3
Zürich	3–1	3–2	4–2	2–1	5–1	2–0	1–2	1–2	3–2	2–1	2–0	5–2	3–2	

Source: rsssf.com
Legend: Blue = home team win; Yellow = draw; Red = away team win.

=== Topscorers ===
Rank	Player	Nat.	Goals	Club
1.	Eugen Meier	(Switzerland)	24	Young Boys
2.	Ernst Wechselberger	(Germany)	21	Young Boys
2.	Jacques Fatton	(Switzerland)	21	Servette
4.	Miodrag Glisovic	(Socialist Federal Republic of Yugoslavia)	20	Grenchen
4.	Erich Probst	(Austria)	20	Zürich
6.	René Hamel	(Switzerland)	19	Grenchen
7.	Marcel Mauron	(Switzerland)	17	Servette
8.	Raymond Duret	(Switzerland)	16	Grasshopper Club
9.	Horst Buhtz	(Germany)	15	Young Fellows Zürich
10.	Walter Beerli	(Switzerland)	13	Luzern
10.	Ferdinando Riva	(Switzerland)	13	Chiasso

== Nationalliga B ==
=== Teams, locations ===
Team	Based in	Canton	Stadium	Capacity
FC Aarau	Aarau	Aargau	Stadion Brügglifeld	9,240
FC Bern	Bern	Bern	Stadion Neufeld	14,000
FC Biel-Bienne	Biel/Bienne	Bern	Stadion Gurzelen	5,500
FC Cantonal Neuchâtel	Neuchâtel	Neuchâtel	Stade de la Maladière	25,500
FC Concordia Basel	Basel	Basel-Stadt	Stadion Rankhof	7,000
FC Fribourg	Fribourg	Fribourg	Stade Universitaire	9,000
FC Lengnau	Lengnau	Bern	Moos Lengnau BE	3,900
FC Schaffhausen	Schaffhausen	Schaffhausen	Stadion Breite	7,300
FC Sion	Sion	Valais	Stade de Tourbillon	16,000
FC Solothurn	Solothurn	Solothurn	Stadion FC Solothurn	6,750
FC Thun	Thun	Bern	Stadion Lachen	10,350
Vevey-Sports	Vevey	Vaud	Stade de Copet	4,000
FC Winterthur	Winterthur	Zürich	Schützenwiese	8,550
Yverdon-Sport FC	Yverdon-les-Bains	Vaud	Stade Municipal	6,600

=== Final league table ===
Pos	Team	Pld	W	D	L	GF	GA	GD	Pts	Qualification or relegation
1	FC Winterthur	26	18	2	6	70	32	+38	38	NLB Champions and promoted to 1959–60 Nationalliga A
2	FC Biel-Bienne	26	16	4	6	70	34	+36	36	Promoted to 1959–60 Nationalliga A
3	FC Cantonal Neuchâtel	26	14	4	8	64	50	+14	32	
4	FC Sion	26	12	5	9	47	52	−5	29	
5	Vevey-Sports	26	11	5	10	57	44	+13	27	
6	FC Bern	26	10	7	9	35	41	−6	27	
7	FC Schaffhausen	26	9	6	11	62	54	+8	24	
8	FC Lengnau	26	10	4	12	49	53	−4	24	
9	FC Aarau	26	10	4	12	32	39	−7	24	
10	FC Fribourg	26	9	6	11	31	38	−7	24	
11	FC Thun	26	8	8	10	45	58	−13	24	
12	Yverdon-Sport FC	26	7	8	11	44	55	−11	22	
13	FC Concordia Basel	26	6	7	13	42	71	−29	19	Relegated to 1959–60 1. Liga
14	FC Solothurn	26	6	2	18	41	68	−27	14	Relegated to 1959–60 1. Liga

Source: rsssf.com
Rules for classification: 1) Points; 2) Goal difference within the league, however with play-off for qualifiers;

== Further in Swiss football ==
- 1958–59 Swiss Cup
- 1958–59 Swiss 1. Liga

== Sources ==
- Switzerland 1958–59 at RSSSF

Preceded by 1957–58	Nationalliga seasons in Switzerland	Succeeded by 1959–60
