= 1958–59 Swiss Cup =

Cup final Program

Tournament details
- Country: Switzerland

Final positions
- Champions: Grenchen
- Runners-up: Servette

The 1958–59 Swiss Cup was the 34th season of Switzerland's football cup competition, organised annually since 1925–26 by the Swiss Football Association.

== Overview ==
This season's cup competition began with the games of the first round, played on the week-end of the 14 September 1958. The competition was completed on Sunday 19 April 1959, with the final, which was traditionally held at the former Wankdorf Stadium in Bern. The clubs from the 1958–59 Swiss 1. Liga were given a bye for the first round, they played in the second round on the week-end of 5 October. The clubs from this season's Nationalliga A (NLA) and from this season's Nationalliga B (NLB) were given byes for the first two rounds. These teams joined the competition in the third round, which was played on the week-end of 26 October.

The matches were played in a knockout format. In the event of a draw after 90 minutes, the match went into extra time. In the event of a draw at the end of extra time, a replay was foreseen and this was played on the visiting team's pitch. If the replay ended in a draw after extra time, a toss of a coin would establish the team that qualified for the next round.

== Round 1 ==
In the first phase, the lower league teams that had qualified themselves for the competition through their regional football association's regional cup competitions or their association's requirements, competed here. Whenever possible, the draw respected local regionalities. The first round was played on the weekend of 14 September 1958.

=== Summary ===
==== Region Ostschweiz ====
Team 1	Score	Team 2
14 September 1958
FC Schmerikon	1–3	FC Flums
FC Rheineck	2–1	FC Fortuna St.Gallen
FC Amriswil	1–3	FC Rorschach

==== Region Zürich ====
Team 1	Score	Team 2
14 September 1958
SV Höngg	2–4	Wettingen
FC Wollishofen	4–2	FC Küsnacht (ZH)
FC Tössfeld (Winterthur)	1–2	FC Flurlingen
FC Phönix Winterthur	0–8	SC Veltheim
Polizei Zürich	2–3 (a.e.t.)	FC Dübendorf
FC Unterstrass (ZH)	3–5	SC Zug
FC Buttikon	3–1 awd forfeit	FC Horgen

- Note: After the match Buttikon–Horgen, the visiting team laid a protest because the goals were not the same size. The dimensions were checked and were not correct. The match was awarded forfeit 0–3.

==== Region Bern ====
Team 1	Score	Team 2
14 September 1958
FC Helvetia Bern	3–2	FC Domdidier
FC Langnau im Emmental	4–2	Dürrenast
FC Bözingen 34	7–4 (a.e.t.)	FC Madretsch (Biel)
FC Grünstern (Ipsach)	4–3	FC Klus-Balsthal

==== Region Solothurn ====
Team 1	Score	Team 2
14 September 1958
FC Oensingen	0–1	FC Gerlafingen

==== Region Nordwestschweiz ====
Team 1	Score	Team 2
14 September 1958
Laufen	5–0	FC Reconvilier
FC Oberdorf	0–5	FC Trimbach
FC Ettingen	1–2	FC Breite (Basel)
Black Stars	3–2	SC Morgarten (Basel)

==== Region Aargau ====
Team 1	Score	Team 2
14 September 1958
Zofingen	5–2	Schöftland
Wohlen	7–1	FC Biberist
FC Dottikon	4–3	FC Klingnau

==== Region Innerschweiz ====
Team 1	Score	Team 2
14 September 1958
Kickers Luzern	0–2	FC Brunnen
Cham	4–1 (a.e.t.)	FC Südstern (Luzern)

==== Region Ticino ====
Team 1	Score	Team 2
14 September 1958
US Magliaso	1–0 (a.e.t.)	SC Balerna

==== Region Romande ====
Team 1	Score	Team 2
14 September 1958
FC Plan-les-Ouates	3–1	CA Genève
Etoile Carouge	5–3	FC Le Sentier
FC Lutry	2–4	FC Assens
FC Aigle	5–0	CS La Tour-de-Peilz
Echallens	0–4	FC Pully
FC Ardon	0–2	FC Raron
FC Ticinese (Le Locle)	3–1	FC Le Parc (La Chaux-de-Fonds)
FC Haute-Rive	1–0	Neuchâtel Xamax
FC Gurmels	0–1	Bulle

== Round 2 ==
The clubs from the 1958–59 Swiss 1. Liga had been given a bye for the first round, they now joined the competition here, in the second round.

=== Summary ===
Team 1	Score	Team 2
5 October 1958
Martigny-Sports	6–0	FC Assens
FC Forward Morges	7–0	FC Plan-les-Ouates
FC Sierre	4–1	FC Pully
Etoile Carouge	2–0	FC Versoix
Central Fribourg	4–2	FC Aigle
Monthey	1–0	C Chailly/Lausanne
ES Malley	2–0	Bulle
FC Stade Payerne	3–1 (a.e.t.)	FC Raron
Nordstern	1–1 (a.e.t.)	Laufen
FC Bassecourt	2–6	FC Haute-Rive
Black Stars	4–1 (a.e.t.)	Alle
FC Bözingen 34	1–3	FC Porrentruy
FC Ticinese (Le Locle)	1–6	Delémont
FC Breite (Basel)	1–5	Moutier
Old Boys	2–1 (a.e.t.)	FC Gerlafingen
FC Grünstern (Ipsach)	1–7	SC Derendingen
FC Langenthal	3–1	FC Trimbach
Burgdorf	5–2	FC Helvetia Bern
Wohlen	3–4	SC Kleinhüningen
US Bienne-Boujean	5–1	FC Langnau im Emmental
FC Wil	1–4	FC Rorschach
FC Ems	0–6	Brühl
St. Gallen	12–2	FC Flums
FC Rheineck	3–5 (a.e.t.)	Uster
FC Wollishofen	1–4	Blue Stars
Baden	0–3	FC Dübendorf
FC Olten	2–1	FC Horgen
FC Dietikon	5–3	SC Veltheim
FC Dottikon	1–4	Red Star
FC Flurlingen	2–1	Emmenbrücke
Cham	1–2	Locarno
Wettingen	3–2 (a.e.t.)	FC Solduno
FC Rapid Lugano	0–0 (a.e.t.)	SC Zug
Zofingen	0–6	US Pro Daro Bellinzona
FC Brunnen	2–2 (a.e.t.)	Mendrisio
US Magliaso	2–4	Bodio

Replays

Team 1	Score	Team 2
12 October 1958
Laufen	1–2	Nordstern
Mendrisio	0–1	FC Brunnen
19 October 1958
SC Zug	1–1 (a.e.t.)	FC Rapid Lugano (t)

- Note: (t): FC Rapid Lugano qualified on toss of a coin.

== Round 3 ==
The teams from the NLA and NLB entered the cup competition in this round. However, the teams from the NLA were seeded and could not be drawn against each other. Whenever possible, the draw respected local regionalities. The third round was played on the week-end of 26 of October.

=== Summary ===
Team 1	Score	Team 2
26 October 1958
Etoile Carouge	6–1	Central Fribourg
FC Stade Payerne	0–3 (a.e.t.)	Lausanne-Sport
Lengnau	4–1 (a.e.t.)	Delémont
La Chaux-de-Fonds	14–0	FC Haute-Rive
Concordia	6–1	Wettingen
SC Kleinhüningen	1–7	Grenchen
FC Brunnen	5–4	US Pro Daro Bellinzona
Uster	0–2 (a.e.t.)	Schaffhausen
Aarau	3–0	FC Flurlingen
SC Derendingen	1–3	Young Boys
Black Stars	2–3	Nordstern
FC Langenthal	1–2	Thun
Winterthur	5–0	FC Dübendorf
Brühl	5–0	Red Star
Locarno	1–2 (a.e.t.)	Chiasso
Young Fellows	4–1	Blue Stars
Servette	5–1	Martigny-Sports
FC Olten	2–5	Biel-Bienne
FC Rorschach	2–4	Grasshopper Club
Lugano	3–0	SC Zug
Sion	1–2	ES Malley
Yverdon-Sport	2–3 (a.e.t.)	US Bienne-Boujean
St. Gallen	0–2	Zürich
Bellinzona	2–0	Bodio
Cantonal Neuchâtel	2–1	Monthey
Fribourg	4–3	Burgdorf
Luzern	4–2	FC Dietikon
Bern	5–0	FC Porrentruy
FC Sierre	0–1	Vevey Sports
FC Forward Morges	1–2	Urania Genève Sport
Basel	3–0	Old Boys
Moutier	3–2	Solothurn

=== Matches ===
26 October 1958

Aarau	3–0	FC Flurlingen
Goal	FCA summary

Stadion Brügglifeld, Aarau

26 October 1958

SC Derendingen	1–3	Young Boys
Goal	YB summary	Goal

Heidenegg, Derendingen

26 October 1958

Servette	5–1	Martigny-Sports
Facchinetti; Fatton; R. Mauron; Rösch; M. Mauron	Servette summary	Goal

Stade des Charmilles, Geneva

26 October 1958

St. Gallen	0–2	Zürich
	FCZ summary	59' (0:1) Probst; 66' (0:2) Bruppacher

Espenmoos, St. Gallen
Attendance: 3,500
Referee: (Switzerland) Albert Guinnard (Gletterens)

26 October 1958
15:00

Basel	3 – 0	Old Boys
Hügi (II) 11' (1:0); Burger 20' (2:0); Weber (penalty missed) 63′ Hügi (II) 88' (3:0)	Summary

Landhof, Basel
Attendance: 3,500
Referee: (Switzerland) Claude Stettler (Feuerthalen)

== Round 4 ==
=== Summary ===
Team 1	Score	Team 2
30 November 1958
Etoile Carouge	1–4	Lausanne-Sport
Lengnau	3–2	La Chaux-de-Fonds
Concordia	1–3	Grenchen
FC Brunnen	0–6	Schaffhausen
Aarau	1–1 (a.e.t.)	Young Boys
Nordstern	1–4	Thun
Winterthur	4–0	Brühl
Chiasso	4–0	Young Fellows
Servette	2–1	Biel-Bienne
Grasshopper Club	3–2	Lugano
ES Malley	3–1	US Bienne-Boujean
Zürich	0–1	Bellinzona
Cantonal Neuchâtel	3–0	Fribourg
Luzern	3–1 (a.e.t.)	Bern
Vevey Sports	1–1 (a.e.t.)	Urania Genève Sport
Basel	0–2	Moutier

Replays

Team 1	Score	Team 2
21 December 1958
Young Boys	3–0	Aarau
Urania Genève Sport	3–0	Vevey Sports

=== Matches ===
30 November 1958

Aarau	1–1 (a.e.t.)	Young Boys
Goal	FCA summary YB summary	Goal

Stadion Brügglifeld, Aarau

21 December 1958

Young Boys	3–0	Aarau
Goal	YB summary FCA summary

Wankdorf Stadium, Bern

30 November 1958

Servette	2–1	Biel-Bienne
2x Fatton	Servette summary	Goal

Stade des Charmilles, Geneva

30 November 1958

Zürich	0–1	Bellinzona
Probst (yellow card) 72'	FCZ summary	26' (0:1) Angelo Pedrazzoli; (yellow card) 45' Robustelli; (yellow card) 72' Santini

Letzigrund, Zürich
Attendance: 9,000
Referee: (Switzerland) René Baumberger (Lausanne)

30 November 1958
14:30

Basel	0–2	Moutier
	FCB summary	24' (0:1) Schaffter; 62' (0:2) Heuri

Landhof, Basel
Attendance: 4,000
Referee: (Switzerland) Jean Meister (Neuchâtel)

== Round 5 ==
=== Summary ===
Team 1	Score	Team 2
27 December 1958
Urania Genève Sport	1–0	Moutier
28 December 1958
Lausanne-Sport	3–1	Lengnau
Grenchen	2–0	Schaffhausen
Young Boys	3–4	Thun
Winterthur	2–2 (a.e.t.)	Chiasso
Servette	ppd	Grasshopper Club
ES Malley	1–3	Bellinzona
Cantonal Neuchâtel	4–1	Luzern

Replays

Team 1	Score	Team 2
4 January 1959
Chiasso	3–0	Winterthur
14 February 1959
Servette	2–0	Grasshopper Club

=== Matches ===
28 December 1958

Young Boys	3–4	Thun
Goal	YB summary	Goal

Wankdorf Stadium, Bern

14 February 1959

Servette	2–0	Grasshopper Club
Makay (1:0); Fatton (2:0)	Servette summary

Stade des Charmilles, Geneva

== Quarter-finals ==
=== Summary ===
Team 1	Score	Team 2
22 February 1959
Lausanne-Sport	2–4	Grenchen
Thun	0–2	Chiasso
Servette	3–0	Bellinzona
Cantonal Neuchâtel	2–1	Urania Genève Sport

=== Matches ===
22 February 1959

Servette	3–0	Bellinzona
Makay (1:0); Németh (2:0); M. Mauron (3:0)	Servette summary

Stade des Charmilles, Geneva

== Semi-finals ==
=== Summary ===
Team 1	Score	Team 2
30 March 1959
Grenchen	1–0	Chiasso
Servette	4–0	Cantonal Neuchâtel

=== Matches ===
30 March 1959

Grenchen	1–0	Chiasso
Sidler 14' (1:0)	Summary

Stadium Brühl, Grenchen

30 March 1959

Servette	4–0	Cantonal Neuchâtel
2x M. Mauron; 1x Németh; 1x Fatton	Servette summary

Stade des Charmilles, Geneva

== Final ==
The final was held at the former Wankdorf Stadium in Bern on Sunday 19 April 1959.

=== Summary ===
Team 1	Score	Team 2
19 April 1959
Grenchen	1–0	Servette

=== Telegram ===
19 April 1959

Grenchen	1–0	Servette
René Hamel 80' (1:0)	Fussball-Schweiz summary

Wankdorf Stadium, Bern
Attendance: 18,000
Referee: (Switzerland) Othmar Huber (Thun)

Grenchen won the cup and this was the club's first cup title to this date.

== Further in Swiss football ==
- 1958–59 Nationalliga A
- 1958–59 Swiss 1. Liga

== Sources ==
- Fussball-Schweiz
- FCB Cup games 1958–59 at fcb-achiv.ch
- Switzerland 1958–59 at RSSSF

Preceded by 1957–58	Swiss Cup seasons	Succeeded by 1959–60
