= 1959–60 Nationalliga A =

Swiss football season

Nationalliga A
- Season: 1959–60
- Champions: Young Boys
- Relegated: Lugano; Bellinzona
- Top goalscorer: Willy Schneider (Young Boys); 25 goals

Nationalliga B
- Season: 1959–60
- Champions: Fribourg
- Promoted: Fribourg; Young Fellows
- Relegated: FC Langenthal; Lengnau
- Top goalscorer: Edy Zimmermann (Young Fellows); 21 goals

The following is the summary of the Swiss National League in the 1959–60 football season, both Nationalliga A and Nationalliga B. This was the 63rd season of top-tier and the 62nd season of second-tier football in Switzerland.

== Overview ==
The Swiss Football Association (ASF/SFV) had 28 member clubs at this time which were divided into two divisions of 14 teams each. The teams played a double round-robin to decide their table positions. Two points were awarded for a win and one point was awarded for a draw. The top tier (NLA) was contested by the top 12 teams from the previous 1958–59 season and the two newly promoted teams FC Winterthur and FC Biel-Bienne. The champions would qualify for the 1960–61 European Cup and the last two teams in the league table at the end of the season were to be relegated.

The second-tier (NLB) was contested by the two teams that had been relegated from the NLA at the end of the last season, Urania Genève Sport and Young Fellows Zürich, the ten teams that had been in third to twelfth position last season and the two newly promoted teams FC Langenthal and SC Brühl. The top two teams at the end of the season would be promoted to the 1960–61 NLA and the two last placed teams would be relegated to the 1960–61 Swiss 1. Liga.

The Swiss champions received a slot in the 1960–61 European Cup and the Swiss Cup winners this season qualified for the first edition of the Cup Winners' Cup which was to be contested in the following season.

== Nationalliga A ==
=== Teams, locations ===
Team	Based in	Canton	Stadium	Capacity
FC Basel	Basel	Basel-Stadt	Landhof	4,000
AC Bellinzona	Bellinzona	Ticino	Stadio Comunale Bellinzona	5,000
FC Biel-Bienne	Biel/Bienne	Bern	Stadion Gurzelen	5,500
FC Chiasso	Chiasso	Ticino	Stadio Comunale Riva IV	4,000
Grasshopper Club Zürich	Zürich	Zürich	Hardturm	20,000
FC Grenchen	Grenchen	Solothurn	Stadium Brühl	10,900
FC La Chaux-de-Fonds	La Chaux-de-Fonds	Neuchâtel	Centre Sportif de la Charrière	10,000
FC Lausanne-Sport	Lausanne	Vaud	Pontaise	30,000
FC Lugano	Lugano	Ticino	Cornaredo Stadium	6,330
FC Luzern	Lucerne	Lucerne	Stadion Allmend	25,000
Servette FC	Geneva	Geneva	Stade des Charmilles	27,000
FC Winterthur	Winterthur	Zürich	Schützenwiese	8,550
BSC Young Boys	Bern	Bern	Wankdorf Stadium	56,000
FC Zürich	Zürich	Zürich	Letzigrund	25,000

=== Final league table ===
Pos	Team	Pld	W	D	L	GF	GA	GD	Pts	Qualification
1	Young Boys	26	20	2	4	86	44	+42	42	Swiss Champions qualified for 1960–61 European Cup
2	Biel-Bienne	26	14	8	4	61	38	+23	36	
3	La Chaux-de-Fonds	26	14	4	8	71	51	+20	32	
4	Zürich	26	13	5	8	64	44	+20	31	
5	Luzern	26	11	5	10	65	62	+3	27	Swiss Cup winners qualified for 1960–61 Cup Winners' Cup
6	Winterthur	26	12	3	11	40	40	0	27	
7	Servette	26	8	9	9	46	39	+7	25	
8	Grasshopper Club	26	8	8	10	54	61	−7	24	
9	Chiasso	26	8	7	11	39	57	−18	23	
10	Basel	26	6	10	10	46	55	−9	22	1960–61 Inter-Cities Fairs Cup
11	Grenchen	26	8	5	13	51	48	+3	21	
12	Lausanne-Sport	26	7	7	12	41	74	−33	21	1960–61 Inter-Cities Fairs Cup
13	Lugano	26	6	6	14	34	52	−18	18	Relegated to 1960–61 Nationalliga B
14	Bellinzona	26	4	7	15	28	61	−33	15	Relegated to 1960–61 Nationalliga B

Source: rsssf.com
Rules for classification: 1) Points; 2) Goal difference within the league, however with play-off for qualifiers;

=== Results ===
Home \ Away	BAS	BEL	BB	CDF	CHI	GCZ	GRE	LS	LUG	LUZ	SER	WIN	YB	ZÜR
Basel		3–1	0–2	4–0	3–0	1–1	1–1	2–2	1–1	3–3	2–2	3–3	3–3	3–1
Bellinzona	0–0		2–1	0–2	1–3	0–0	0–0	1–1	2–0	0–2	0–0	3–0	0–4	3–2
Biel-Bienne	3–1	7–0		2–0	0–0	5–1	3–2	3–0	1–1	2–2	2–0	1–1	3–1	2–1
La Chaux-de-Fonds	4–1	5–1	4–0		1–1	4–3	1–2	5–1	7–0	2–2	4–2	2–1	5–1	3–2
Chiasso	2–1	6–3	2–5	1–1		2–2	1–4	1–1	1–1	3–1	1–3	1–0	0–4	0–2
Grasshopper Club	3–0	2–2	5–5	1–1	1–1		1–0	5–0	4–2	4–2	4–1	1–2	5–3	0–2
Grenchen	3–2	4–1	2–2	3–4	1–2	5–1		1–2	5–1	2–4	0–0	3–0	1–3	0–1
Lausanne-Sports	2–1	2–0	3–3	0–4	3–1	5–4	4–3		2–3	0–4	3–3	1–0	0–2	2–2
Lugano	2–4	2–1	1–1	3–0	0–2	3–1	2–1	4–0		1–1	1–3	1–2	1–2	0–1
Luzern	6–1	3–2	2–3	2–5	5–1	6–0	2–4	5–2	1–0		0–3	0–2	4–8	2–1
Servette	5–2	1–1	0–2	5–3	1–2	0–0	0–0	5–0	4–2	4–2		1–2	1–2	1–1
Winterthur	2–0	2–0	0–1	2–0	2–1	3–1	2–1	5–0	1–1	2–3	2–0		1–2	1–2
Young Boys	1–1	6–2	3–2	8–3	3–1	4–1	3–2	2–1	4–2	4–1	4–0	5–0		2–3
Zürich	2–3	3–2	4–1	3–1	8–2	2–3	5–1	4–4	2–1	2–2	1–1	6–2	1–2	

Source: rsssf.com
Legend: Blue = home team win; Yellow = draw; Red = away team win.

=== Topscorers ===
Rank	Player	Nat.	Goals	Club
1.	Willy Schneider	(Switzerland)	25	Young Boys
2.	Eugen Meier	(Switzerland)	21	Young Boys
3.	Edgar Graf	(Switzerland)	19	Biel-Bienne
3.	Philippe Pottier	(Switzerland)	19	La Chaux-de-Fonds
5.	Peter Lüscher	(Switzerland)	18	Luzern
5.	Bruno Brizzi	(Switzerland)	18	Zürich
7.	Kurt Sommerlatt	(Germany)	17	La Chaux-de-Fonds
8.	Jacques Fatton	(Switzerland)	16	Servette
9.	Josef Hügi	(Switzerland)	15	Basel
9.	Roberto Frigerio	(Switzerland)	15	Basel
9.	Miodrag Glišović	(Socialist Federal Republic of Yugoslavia)	15	Grenchen
9.	Erich Hahn	(Germany)	15	Luzern
13.	Charles Antenen	(Switzerland)	13	La Chaux-de-Fonds
13.	Ernst Wechselberger	(Germany)	13	Young Boys

== Nationalliga B ==
=== Teams, locations ===
Team	Based in	Canton	Stadium	Capacity
FC Aarau	Aarau	Aargau	Stadion Brügglifeld	9,240
FC Bern	Bern	Bern	Stadion Neufeld	14,000
SC Brühl	St. Gallen	St. Gallen	Paul-Grüninger-Stadion	4,200
FC Cantonal Neuchâtel	Neuchâtel	Neuchâtel	Stade de la Maladière	25,500
FC Fribourg	Fribourg	Fribourg	Stade Universitaire	9,000
FC Langenthal	Langenthal	Bern	Rankmatte	2,000
FC Lengnau	Lengnau	Bern	Moos Lengnau BE	3,900
FC Schaffhausen	Schaffhausen	Schaffhausen	Stadion Breite	7,300
FC Sion	Sion	Valais	Stade de Tourbillon	16,000
FC Thun	Thun	Bern	Stadion Lachen	10,350
Urania Genève Sport	Genève	Geneva	Stade de Frontenex	4,000
Vevey Sports	Vevey	Vaud	Stade de Copet	4,000
FC Young Fellows	Zürich	Zürich	Utogrund	2,850
Yverdon-Sport FC	Yverdon-les-Bains	Vaud	Stade Municipal	6,600

=== Final league table ===
Pos	Team	Pld	W	D	L	GF	GA	GD	Pts	Qualification or relegation
1	Young Fellows Zürich	26	16	5	5	55	34	+21	37	Both promoted, however play-off for NLB championship title
2	FC Fribourg	26	16	5	5	50	31	+19	37	Both promoted, however play-off for NLB championship title
3	SC Brühl	26	12	7	7	50	51	−1	31	
4	Yverdon-Sport FC	26	10	9	7	49	41	+8	29	
5	FC Bern	26	10	9	7	52	52	0	29	
6	FC Thun	26	11	5	10	62	43	+19	27	
7	Urania Genève Sport	26	11	3	12	56	51	+5	25	
8	Vevey Sports	26	7	10	9	54	49	+5	24	
9	FC Sion	26	10	3	13	54	52	+2	23	
10	FC Aarau	26	9	5	12	45	50	−5	23	
11	FC Schaffhausen	26	9	5	12	39	45	−6	23	
12	FC Cantonal Neuchâtel	26	8	6	12	48	55	−7	22	
13	FC Langenthal	26	7	7	12	29	42	−13	21	Relegated to 1960–61 1. Liga
14	Lengnau	26	2	9	15	33	80	−47	13	Relegated to 1960–61 1. Liga

Source: rsssf.com
Rules for classification: 1) Points; 2) Goal difference within the league, however with play-off for qualifiers;

=== Play-off for title ===
Young Fellows Zürich and FC Fribourg finished level on points in joint first position and had both achieved promotion to 1960–61 Nationalliga A. However, it required a play-off to decide the title as NLB champions and this took place on 15 June 1960 in Wankdorf Stadium, Bern.

Team 1	Score	Team 2
Young Fellows Zürich	1–4	FC Fribourg

FC Fribourg won the NLB championship.

== Further in Swiss football ==
- 1959–60 Swiss Cup
- 1959–60 Swiss 1. Liga

== Sources ==
- Switzerland 1959–60 at RSSSF

Preceded by 1958–59	Nationalliga seasons in Switzerland	Succeeded by 1960–61
