= Eugen Meier =

Eugen Meier may refer to:

- Eugen Meier (composer) (born 1934), Swiss composer and conductor
- Eugen Meier (footballer) (1930–2002), Swiss footballer
