= 1958–59 Swiss 1. Liga =

1. Liga
- Season: 1958–59
- Champions: 1. Liga champions: FC Langenthal; Group West: FC Langenthal; Group Cenral: FC Moutier; Group South and East: SC Brühl
- Promoted: FC Langenthal; SC Brühl
- Relegated: Group West: FC Central Fribourg; Group Central: SC Kleinhüningen; Group South and East: FC Uster; US Pro Daro
- Matches: 3 times 132 plus 6 play-offs and 3 play-outs

The 1958–59 1. Liga season was the 27th season of the 1. Liga since its creation in 1931. At this time, the 1. Liga was the third-tier of the Swiss football league system and it was the highest level of total amateur football. At this time, the clubs in the two higher divisions in Switzerland were starting to employ semi-professional or even professional players.

== Format ==
There were 36 teams competing in the 1. Liga 1958–59 season. They were divided into three regional groups, each group with 12 teams. Within each group, the teams would play a double round-robin to decide their league position. Two points were awarded for a win and one point was awarded for a draw. The three group winners then contested a play-off round to decide the two promotion slots. The last placed team in each group were directly relegated to the 2. Liga (fourth tier). The three second last placed teams were to contest a play-out to decide the fourth relegation slot.

== Group West ==
=== Teams, locations ===
| Club | Based in | Canton | Stadium | Capacity |
|---|---|---|---|---|
| US Bienne-Boujean | Biel/Bienne | Bern | | |
| SC Burgdorf | Burgdorf | Bern | Stadion Neumatt | 3,850 |
| SC Derendingen | Derendingen | Solothurn | Heidenegg | 1,500 |
| FC Central Fribourg | Fribourg | Fribourg | Guintzet | 2,000 |
| FC Langenthal | Langenthal | Bern | Rankmatte | 2,000 |
| ES FC Malley | Malley | Vaud | Centre sportif de la Tuilière | 1,500 |
| FC Martigny-Sports | Martigny | Valais | Stade d'Octodure | 2,500 |
| FC Monthey | Monthey | Valais | Stade Philippe Pottier | 1,800 |
| FC Forward Morges | Morges | Vaud | Parc des Sports | 600 |
| FC Sierre | Sierre | Valais | Complexe Ecossia | 2,000 |
| FC Stade Payerne | Payerne | Vaud | Stade Municipal | 1,100 |
| FC Versoix | Versoix | Geneva | Centre sportif de la Bécassière | 1,000 |

=== Final league table ===
| Pos | Team | Pld | W | D | L | GF | GA | GD | Pts | Qualification or relegation |
|---|---|---|---|---|---|---|---|---|---|---|
| 1 | FC Langenthal | 22 | 12 | 6 | 4 | 50 | 30 | +20 | 30 | Play-off for promotion |
| 2 | ES FC Malley | 22 | 11 | 6 | 5 | 50 | 40 | +10 | 28 | |
| 3 | FC Stade Payerne | 22 | 9 | 7 | 6 | 48 | 40 | +8 | 25 | |
| 4 | FC Versoix | 22 | 10 | 5 | 7 | 46 | 43 | +3 | 25 | |
| 5 | SC Burgdorf | 22 | 10 | 4 | 8 | 53 | 37 | +16 | 24 | |
| 6 | FC Monthey | 22 | 10 | 3 | 9 | 38 | 40 | −2 | 23 | |
| 7 | FC Forward Morges | 22 | 7 | 8 | 7 | 42 | 36 | +6 | 22 | |
| 8 | FC Martigny-Sports | 22 | 7 | 8 | 7 | 31 | 33 | −2 | 22 | |
| 9 | US Bienne-Boujean | 22 | 7 | 6 | 9 | 28 | 29 | −1 | 20 | |
| 10 | FC Sierre | 22 | 8 | 4 | 10 | 28 | 39 | −11 | 20 | |
| 11 | SC Derendingen | 22 | 6 | 4 | 12 | 26 | 40 | −14 | 16 | Play-out against relegation |
| 12 | FC Central Fribourg | 22 | 3 | 3 | 16 | 33 | 66 | −33 | 9 | Relegation to 2. Liga |

Source: RSSSF
Rules for classification: 1) Points; 2) Goal difference within the league, but decider play-off for qualifiers.

== Group Central ==
=== Teams, locations ===
| Club | Based in | Canton | Stadium | Capacity |
|---|---|---|---|---|
| FC Alle | Alle | Jura | Centre Sportif Régional | 2,000 |
| FC Baden | Baden | Aargau | Esp Stadium | 7,000 |
| FC Bassecourt | Bassecourt | Jura | Stade des Grands-Prés | 3,650 |
| SR Delémont | Delémont | Jura | La Blancherie | 5,263 |
| FC Dietikon | Dietikon | Zürich | Fussballplatz Dornau | 1,000 |
| FC Emmenbrücke | Emmen | Lucerne | Stadion Gersag | 8,700 |
| SC Kleinhüningen | Basel | Basel-Stadt | Sportplatz Schorenmatte | 300 |
| FC Moutier | Moutier | Bern | Stade de Chalière | 5,000 |
| FC Nordstern Basel | Basel | Basel-Stadt | Rankhof | 7,600 |
| BSC Old Boys | Basel | Basel-Stadt | Stadion Schützenmatte | 8,000 |
| FC Olten | Olten | Solothurn | Sportanlagen Kleinholz | 8,000 |
| FC Porrentruy | Porrentruy | Jura | Stade du Tirage | 4,226 |

=== Final league table ===
| Pos | Team | Pld | W | D | L | GF | GA | GD | Pts | Qualification or relegation |
|---|---|---|---|---|---|---|---|---|---|---|
| 1 | FC Moutier | 22 | 12 | 6 | 4 | 55 | 29 | +26 | 30 | Play-off for promotion |
| 2 | FC Dietikon | 22 | 12 | 4 | 6 | 51 | 33 | +18 | 28 | |
| 3 | FC Nordstern Basel | 22 | 11 | 3 | 8 | 54 | 38 | +16 | 25 | |
| 4 | FC Bassecourt | 22 | 10 | 4 | 8 | 37 | 37 | 0 | 24 | |
| 5 | FC Baden | 22 | 9 | 5 | 8 | 36 | 35 | +1 | 23 | |
| 6 | SR Delémont | 22 | 9 | 5 | 8 | 39 | 40 | −1 | 23 | |
| 7 | FC Alle | 22 | 7 | 7 | 8 | 34 | 36 | −2 | 21 | |
| 8 | BSC Old Boys | 22 | 7 | 6 | 9 | 27 | 42 | −15 | 20 | |
| 9 | FC Porrentruy | 22 | 7 | 5 | 10 | 34 | 40 | −6 | 19 | |
| 10 | FC Emmenbrücke | 22 | 8 | 3 | 11 | 35 | 45 | −10 | 19 | |
| 11 | FC Olten | 22 | 6 | 5 | 11 | 34 | 39 | −5 | 17 | Play-out against relegation |
| 12 | SC Kleinhüningen | 22 | 5 | 5 | 12 | 32 | 54 | −22 | 15 | Relegation to 2. Liga |

Source: RSSSF
Rules for classification: 1) Points; 2) Goal difference within the league, but decider play-off for qualifiers.

== Group South and East ==
=== Teams, locations ===
| Club | Based in | Canton | Stadium | Capacity |
|---|---|---|---|---|
| FC Blue Stars Zürich | Zürich | Zürich | Hardhof | 1,000 |
| FC Bodio | Bodio | Ticino | Campo comunale Pollegio | 1,000 |
| SC Brühl | St. Gallen | St. Gallen | Paul-Grüninger-Stadion | 4,200 |
| FC Locarno | Locarno | Ticino | Stadio comunale Lido | 5,000 |
| FC Mendrisio | Mendrisio | Ticino | Centro Sportivo Comunale | 4,000 |
| US Pro Daro | Bellinzona | Ticino | Campo Geretta / Stadio Comunale Bellinzona | 500 / 5,000 |
| FC Rapid Lugano | Lugano | Ticino | Cornaredo Stadium | 6,330 |
| FC Red Star Zürich | Zürich | Zürich | Allmend Brunau | 2,000 |
| FC Solduno | Locarno | Ticino | Campo Morettina / Stadio del Lido | 1,000 / 5,000 |
| FC St. Gallen | St. Gallen | St. Gallen | Espenmoos | 11,000 |
| FC Uster| | Uster | Zürich | Sportanlage Buchholz | 7,000 |
| FC Wil | Wil | St. Gallen | Sportpark Bergholz | 6,048 |

=== Final league table ===
| Pos | Team | Pld | W | D | L | GF | GA | GD | Pts | Qualification or relegation |
|---|---|---|---|---|---|---|---|---|---|---|
| 1 | SC Brühl | 22 | 15 | 3 | 4 | 54 | 26 | +28 | 33 | Play-off for promotion |
| 2 | FC Blue Stars Zürich | 22 | 13 | 6 | 3 | 53 | 27 | +26 | 32 | |
| 3 | FC St. Gallen | 22 | 10 | 8 | 4 | 45 | 19 | +26 | 28 | |
| 4 | FC Bodio | 22 | 7 | 7 | 8 | 34 | 31 | +3 | 21 | |
| 5 | FC Locarno | 22 | 6 | 9 | 7 | 36 | 37 | −1 | 21 | |
| 6 | FC Wil | 22 | 7 | 7 | 8 | 29 | 35 | −6 | 21 | |
| 7 | FC Mendrisio | 22 | 8 | 5 | 9 | 32 | 42 | −10 | 21 | |
| 8 | FC Red Star Zürich | 22 | 8 | 4 | 10 | 46 | 45 | +1 | 20 | |
| 9 | FC Rapid Lugano | 22 | 6 | 7 | 9 | 26 | 30 | −4 | 19 | |
| 10 | FC Solduno | 22 | 7 | 4 | 11 | 26 | 48 | −22 | 18 | |
| 11 | US Pro Daro | 22 | 6 | 4 | 12 | 23 | 38 | −15 | 16 | Play-out against relegation |
| 12 | FC Uster | 22 | 4 | 6 | 12 | 18 | 44 | −26 | 14 | Relegation to 2. Liga |

Source: RSSSF
Rules for classification: 1) Points; 2) Goal difference within the league, but decider play-off for qualifiers.

== Promotion, relegation ==
=== Promotion play-off ===
The matches in the play-off were played on 21 and 28 June and on 5 July.

==== Round robin ====
| Pos | Team | Pld | W | D | L | GF | GA | GD | Pts | LAN | BRÜ | MOU |
|---|---|---|---|---|---|---|---|---|---|---|---|---|
| 1 | FC Langenthal | 2 | 1 | 0 | 1 | 5 | 7 | −2 | 2 | — | — | 3–2 |
| 2 | SC Brühl | 2 | 1 | 0 | 1 | 6 | 4 | +2 | 2 | 5–2 | — | — |
| 3 | FC Moutier | 2 | 1 | 0 | 1 | 4 | 4 | 0 | 2 | — | 2–1 | — |

Source: RSSSF
Rules for classification: 1) Points; 2) Head-to-head 3) Decider.

==== Replay ====
A replay round was required due to the egality of the teams. The matches were played on 12, 19 and 26 July.

| Pos | Team | Pld | W | D | L | GF | GA | GD | Pts | Qualification | LAN | BRÜ | MOU |
|---|---|---|---|---|---|---|---|---|---|---|---|---|---|
| 1 | FC Langenthal | 2 | 2 | 0 | 0 | 3 | 0 | +3 | 4 | Champions | — | 1–0 | — |
| 2 | SC Brühl | 2 | 1 | 0 | 1 | 1 | 1 | 0 | 2 | Promoted | — | — | 1–0 |
| 3 | FC Moutier | 2 | 0 | 0 | 2 | 0 | 3 | −3 | 0 | | 0–2 | — | — |

Source: RSSSF
Rules for classification: 1) Points; 2) Head-to-head 3) Decider.

FC Langenthal became 1. Liga champions and together with SC Brühl were promoted to 1959–60 Nationalliga B. Moutier remained in the division for the following season.

=== Relegation play-out ===
The matches in the play-out took place on 21 and 28 June 1959.

| Pos | Team | Pld | W | D | L | GF | GA | GD | Pts | Qualification | OLT | DER | PRO |
|---|---|---|---|---|---|---|---|---|---|---|---|---|---|
| 1 | FC Olten | 1 | 1 | 0 | 0 | 5 | 1 | +4 | 2 | | — | n/p | — |
| 2 | SC Derendingen | 1 | 1 | 0 | 0 | 3 | 0 | +3 | 2 | | 3–0 | — | — |
| 3 | US Pro Daro | 2 | 0 | 0 | 2 | 1 | 8 | −7 | 0 | Relegation | 1–5 | — | — |

Source: RSSSF
Rules for classification: 1) Points; 2) Head-to-head 3) Decider.

The match Olten against Derendingen was not played, both teams remained in the division for the next season. As fourth and final team Pro Daro were relegated to 2. Liga.

== Further in Swiss football ==
- 1958–59 Nationalliga A
- 1958–59 Nationalliga B
- 1958–59 Swiss Cup

== Sources ==
- Switzerland 1958–59 at RSSSF

| Preceded by 1957–58 | Seasons in Swiss 1. Liga | Succeeded by 1959–60 |
