= 1959–60 Swiss 1. Liga =

1. Liga
- Season: 1959–60
- Champions: 1. Liga champions: Martigny-Sports; Group West: Martigny-Sports; Group Cenral: Nordstern; Group South and East: FC Bodio
- Promoted: Martigny-Sports; Nordstern
- Relegated: Group West: US Bienne-Boujean; SC Derendingen; Group Central: FC Olten; Group South and East: Mendrisiostar
- Matches: 3 times 132 and 4 deciders plus 3 play-offs and 2 play-outs

The 1959–60 1. Liga season was the 28th season of the 1. Liga since its creation in 1931. At this time, the 1. Liga was the third-tier of the Swiss football league system and it was the highest level of total amateur football. At this time, most the clubs in the highest division, and also in the second highest, in Switzerland were starting to employ semi-professional or even professional players.

== Format ==
There were 36 teams competing in the 1. Liga 1959–60 season. They were divided into three regional groups, each group with 12 teams. Within each group, the teams would play a double round-robin to decide their league position. Two points were awarded for a win and one for a draw. The three group winners then contested a play-off round to decide the two promotion slots. The last placed team in each group were directly relegated to the 2. Liga (fourth tier). The three second last placed teams were to contest a play-out to decide the fourth relegation slot.

== Group West ==
=== Teams, locations ===
Club	Based in	Canton	Stadium	Capacity
US Bienne-Boujean	Biel/Bienne	Bern		
FC Bözingen 34	Biel/Bienne	Bern	Längfeld	1,000
SC Derendingen	Derendingen	Solothurn	Heidenegg	1,500
Étoile Carouge FC	Carouge	Geneva	Stade de la Fontenette	3,690
ES FC Malley	Malley	Vaud	Centre sportif de la Tuilière	1,500
FC Martigny-Sports	Martigny	Valais	Stade d'Octodure	2,500
FC Monthey	Monthey	Valais	Stade Philippe Pottier	1,800
FC Forward Morges	Morges	Vaud	Parc des Sports	600
FC Sierre	Sierre	Valais	Complexe Ecossia	2,000
FC Solothurn	Solothurn	Solothurn	Stadion FC Solothurn	6,750
FC Stade Payerne	Payerne	Vaud	Stade Municipal	1,100
FC Versoix	Versoix	Geneva	Centre sportif de la Bécassière	1,000

=== Final league table ===
Pos	Team	Pld	W	D	L	GF	GA	GD	Pts	Qualification or relegation
1	FC Martigny-Sports	22	15	4	3	56	24	+32	34	Play-off to Nationalliga B
2	FC Versoix	22	13	2	7	59	44	+15	28	
3	FC Sierre	22	12	3	7	54	47	+7	27	
4	FC Solothurn	22	11	3	8	56	37	+19	25	
5	Etoile Carouge FC	22	11	2	9	54	51	+3	24	
6	FC Stade Payerne	22	10	3	9	37	56	−19	23	
7	FC Forward Morges	22	7	6	9	41	45	−4	20	
8	FC Monthey	22	7	5	10	47	44	+3	19	
9	ES FC Malley	22	5	8	9	34	43	−9	18	
10	FC Bözingen 34	22	7	4	11	40	57	−17	18	
11	US Bienne-Boujean	22	6	3	13	36	45	−9	15	Play-out against relegation
12	SC Derendingen	22	4	5	13	32	47	−15	13	Relegation to 2. Liga

Source: RSSSF
Rules for classification: 1) Points; 2) Goal difference within the league, but decider play-off for qualifiers.

== Group Central ==
=== Teams, locations ===
Club	Based in	Canton	Stadium	Capacity
FC Alle	Alle	Jura	Centre Sportif Régional	2,000
FC Baden	Baden	Aargau	Esp Stadium	7,000
FC Bassecourt	Bassecourt	Jura	Stade des Grands-Prés	3,650
SC Burgdorf	Burgdorf	Bern	Stadion Neumatt	3,850
FC Concordia Basel	Basel	Basel-Stadt	Stadion Rankhof	7,000
SR Delémont	Delémont	Jura	La Blancherie	5,263
FC Moutier	Moutier	Bern	Stade de Chalière	5,000
FC Nordstern Basel	Basel	Basel-Stadt	Rankhof	7,600
BSC Old Boys	Basel	Basel-Stadt	Stadion Schützenmatte	8,000
FC Olten	Olten	Solothurn	Sportanlagen Kleinholz	8,000
FC Porrentruy	Porrentruy	Jura	Stade du Tirage	4,226
FC Wettingen	Wettingen	Aargau	Stadion Altenburg	10,000

=== Final league table ===
Pos	Team	Pld	W	D	L	GF	GA	GD	Pts	Qualification or relegation
1	FC Nordstern Basel	22	13	3	6	59	32	+27	29	Play-off to Nationalliga B
2	FC Alle	22	10	7	5	42	29	+13	27	
3	FC Moutier	22	9	8	5	49	32	+17	26	
4	BSC Old Boys	22	10	6	6	35	39	−4	26	
5	FC Concordia Basel	22	10	4	8	48	38	+10	24	
6	SC Burgdorf	22	8	7	7	42	30	+12	23	
7	FC Porrentruy	22	8	4	10	49	47	+2	20	
8	FC Baden	22	7	6	9	31	34	−3	20	
9	FC Bassecourt	22	7	6	9	35	40	−5	20	
10	SR Delémont	22	8	4	10	31	50	−19	20	
11	FC Wettingen	22	6	7	9	33	40	−7	19	Play-out against relegation
12	FC Olten	22	3	4	15	30	73	−43	10	Relegation to 2. Liga

Source: RSSSF
Rules for classification: 1) Points; 2) Goal difference within the league, but decider play-off for qualifiers.

== Group South and East ==
=== Teams, locations ===
Club	Based in	Canton	Stadium	Capacity
FC Blue Stars Zürich	Zürich	Zürich	Hardhof	1,000
FC Bodio	Bodio	Ticino	Campo comunale Pollegio	1,000
FC Dietikon	Dietikon	Zürich	Fussballplatz Dornau	1,000
FC Emmenbrücke	Emmen	Lucerne	Stadion Gersag	8,700
SV Höngg	Zürich	Zürich	Hönggerberg	1,000
FC Locarno	Locarno	Ticino	Stadio comunale Lido	5,000
FC Rapid Lugano	Lugano	Ticino	Cornaredo Stadium	6,330
Mendrisiostar	Mendrisio	Ticino	Centro Sportivo Comunale	4,000
FC Red Star Zürich	Zürich	Zürich	Allmend Brunau	2,000
FC Solduno	Locarno	Ticino	Campo Morettina / Stadio del Lido	1,000 / 5,000
FC St. Gallen	St. Gallen	St. Gallen	Espenmoos	11,000
FC Wil	Wil	St. Gallen	Sportpark Bergholz	6,048

=== Final league table ===
Pos	Team	Pld	W	D	L	GF	GA	GD	Pts	Qualification or relegation
1	FC Blue Stars Zürich	22	15	2	5	65	30	+35	32	Decider for first position
2	FC Bodio	22	13	6	3	42	26	+16	32	Decider for first position
3	FC St. Gallen	22	12	3	7	56	34	+22	27	
4	FC Emmenbrücke	22	11	3	8	43	46	−3	25	
5	FC Rapid Lugano	22	7	8	7	40	33	+7	22	
6	FC Red Star Zürich	22	8	6	8	43	45	−2	22	
7	FC Solduno	22	8	5	9	36	35	+1	21	
8	FC Locarno	22	8	4	10	33	42	−9	20	
9	FC Dietikon	22	7	4	11	41	42	−1	18	Decider for eleventh position
10	SV Höngg	22	6	6	10	22	38	−16	18	Decider for eleventh position
11	FC Wil	22	8	2	12	25	41	−16	18	Decider for eleventh position
12	Mendrisiostar	22	1	7	14	16	50	−34	9	Relegation to 2. Liga

Source: RSSSF
Rules for classification: 1) Points; 2) Goal difference within the league, but decider play-off for qualifiers.

=== Decider for first place ===
The decider match for first place and division championship was played on 12 June 1960 in Olten.

Team 1	Score	Team 2
FC Bodio	1–0	Blue Stars

FC Bodio win group championship and advance to play-offs for promotion. Blue Stars remain in the division.

=== Decider for eleventh position ===
The play-outs were played on 12, 15 and 19 June.

Pos	Team	Pld	W	D	L	GF	GA	GD	Pts	Qualification	DIE	WIL	HÖN
1	FC Dietikon	2	1	1	0	4	1	+3	3		—	—	1–1
2	FC Wil	2	1	0	1	6	6	0	2		0–3	—	—
3	SV Höngg	2	0	1	1	4	7	−3	1	Play-out against relegation	—	3–6	—

Source: RSSSF
Rules for classification: 1) Points; 2) Head-to-head 3) Decider.

FC Dietikon and FC Wil remain in division. SV Höngg continue in play-outs against relegation.

== Promotion, relegation ==
=== Play-off for promotion ===
The play-offs for the two promotion slots were played on 12, 15 and 19 June.

Pos	Team	Pld	W	D	L	GF	GA	GD	Pts	Qualification	MAS	NOR	BOD
1	FC Martigny-Sports	2	2	0	0	6	2	+4	4	Champions	—	4–1	—
2	FC Nordstern Basel	2	1	0	1	7	7	0	2	Promoted	—	—	6–3
3	FC Bodio	2	0	0	2	4	8	−4	0		1–2	—	—

Source: RSSSF
Rules for classification: 1) Points; 2) Head-to-head 3) Decider.

Martigny-Sports become 1. Liga champions and together with Nordstern are promoted to 1960–61 Nationalliga B.

=== Play-out against relegation ===
The play-outs were played on 12 and 26 June.

Pos	Team	Pld	W	D	L	GF	GA	GD	Pts	Qualification or relegation	HÖN	WET	BBB
1	SV Höngg	1	1	0	0	4	0	+4	2		—	—	4–0
2	FC Wettingen	1	1	0	0	3	2	+1	2		n/p	—	—
3	US Bienne-Boujean	2	0	0	2	2	7	−5	0	Relegation	—	2–3	—

Source: RSSSF
Rules for classification: 1) Points; 2) Head-to-head 3) Decider.

The match Wettingen–Höngg was not played, both teams remain in division. As fourth and final team US Bienne-Boujean are relegated to 2. Liga.

== Further in Swiss football ==
- 1959–60 Nationalliga A
- 1959–60 Nationalliga B
- 1959–60 Swiss Cup

== Sources ==
- Switzerland 1959–60 at RSSSF

Preceded by 1958–59	Seasons in Swiss 1. Liga	Succeeded by 1960–61
