= 1957–58 Swiss 1. Liga =

1. Liga
- Season: 1957–58
- Champions: 1. Liga champions: Vevey Sports; Group West: Vevey Sports; Group Cenral: FC Aarau; Group South and East: Blue Stars
- Promoted: Vevey Sports; FC Aarau
- Relegated: Group West: CS International Genève; CS La Tour-de-Peilz; Group Central: FC Birsfelden; Group South and East: FC Rorschach
- Matches: 3 times 132 and 3 deciders plus 3 play-offs and 2 play-outs

The 1957–58 1. Liga season was the 26th season of the 1. Liga since its creation in 1931. At this time, the 1. Liga was the third-tier of the Swiss football league system and it was the highest level of total amateur football. At this time, the clubs in the two higher divisions in Switzerland were starting to employ semi-professional or even professional players.

== Format ==
There were 36 teams competing in the 1. Liga 1957–58 season. They were divided into three regional groups, each group with 12 teams. Within each group, the teams would play a double round-robin to decide their league position. Two points were awarded for a win and one point was awarded for a draw. The three group winners then contested a play-off round to decide the two promotion slots. The last placed team in each group was directly relegated to the 2. Liga (fourth tier). The three second last placed teams were to contest a play-out to decide the fourth relegation slot.

== Group West ==
=== Teams, locations ===
Club	Based in	Canton	Stadium	Capacity
US Bienne-Boujean	Biel/Bienne	Bern		
SC Burgdorf	Burgdorf	Bern	Stadion Neumatt	3,850
FC Central Fribourg	Fribourg	Fribourg	Guintzet	2,000
CS International Genève	Geneva	Geneva		
CS La Tour-de-Peilz	La Tour-de-Peilz	Vaud	Stade de Bel-Air	1,000
FC Langenthal	Langenthal	Bern	Rankmatte	2,000
FC Martigny-Sports	Martigny	Valais	Stade d'Octodure	2,500
FC Monthey	Monthey	Valais	Stade Philippe Pottier	1,800
FC Forward Morges	Morges	Vaud	Parc des Sports	600
FC Sierre	Sierre	Valais	Complexe Ecossia	2,000
FC Stade Payerne	Payerne	Vaud	Stade Municipal	1,100
Vevey Sports	Vevey	Vaud	Stade de Copet	4,000

=== Final league table ===
Pos	Team	Pld	W	D	L	GF	GA	GD	Pts	Qualification or relegation
1	Vevey Sports	22	17	2	3	78	25	+53	36	Play-off for promotion
2	FC Martigny-Sports	22	15	3	4	58	31	+27	33	
3	FC Langenthal	22	9	6	7	40	32	+8	24	
4	FC Stade Payerne	22	9	5	8	49	44	+5	23	
5	SC Burgdorf	22	9	5	8	45	43	+2	23	
6	FC Monthey	22	8	6	8	44	42	+2	22	
7	US Bienne-Boujean	22	9	4	9	52	50	+2	22	
8	FC Sierre	22	8	4	10	40	56	−16	20	
9	Central Fribourg	22	9	2	11	40	57	−17	20	
10	FC Forward Morges	22	7	3	12	36	38	−2	17	
11	CS La Tour-de-Peilz	22	6	2	14	26	56	−30	14	Play-out against relegation
12	CS International Genève	22	4	2	16	27	61	−34	10	Relegation to 2. Liga

Source: rsssf
Rules for classification: 1) Points; 2) Goal difference within the league, but decider play-off for qualifiers.

== Group Central ==
=== Teams, locations ===
Club	Based in	Canton	Stadium	Capacity
FC Aarau	Aarau	Aargau	Stadion Brügglifeld	9,240
FC Baden	Baden	Aargau	Esp Stadium	7,000
FC Bassecourt	Bassecourt	Jura	Stade des Grands-Prés	3,650
FC Birsfelden	Birsfelden	Basel-Landschaft	Sternenfeld	9,400
SR Delémont	Delémont	Jura	La Blancherie	5,263
SC Derendingen	Derendingen	Solothurn	Heidenegg	1,500
FC Emmenbrücke	Emmen	Lucerne	Stadion Gersag	8,700
SC Kleinhüningen	Basel	Basel-Stadt	Sportplatz Schorenmatte	300
FC Moutier	Moutier	Bern	Stade de Chalière	5,000
BSC Old Boys	Basel	Basel-Stadt	Stadion Schützenmatte	8,000
FC Olten	Olten	Solothurn	Sportanlagen Kleinholz	8,000
FC Porrentruy	Porrentruy	Jura	Stade du Tirage	4,226

=== Final league table ===
Pos	Team	Pld	W	D	L	GF	GA	GD	Pts	Qualification or relegation
1	FC Porrentruy	22	13	7	2	50	27	+23	33	Decider for first place
2	FC Aarau	22	12	9	1	41	20	+21	33	Decider for first place
3	FC Moutier	22	13	5	4	54	37	+17	31	
4	FC Bassecourt	22	10	6	6	48	34	+14	26	
5	SC Kleinhüningen	22	9	4	9	37	33	+4	22	
6	SC Derendingen	22	8	4	10	37	29	+8	20	
7	FC Olten	22	9	2	11	48	58	−10	20	
8	BSC Old Boys	22	6	7	9	41	41	0	19	
9	SR Delémont	22	6	7	9	41	39	+2	19	
10	FC Emmenbrücke	22	8	3	11	39	55	−16	19	
11	FC Baden	22	6	4	12	30	37	−7	16	Play-out against relegation
12	FC Birsfelden	22	2	2	18	29	85	−56	6	Relegation to 2. Liga

Source: rsssf
Rules for classification: 1) Points; 2) Goal difference within the league, but decider play-off for qualifiers.

=== Decider for first place ===
The play-off for the group championship took place on 8 June 1958 in Basel.

Team 1	Score	Team 2
Aarau	4–2	Porrentruy

Aarau won, became group champions and advanced to promotion play-offs.

== Group South and East ==
=== Teams, locations ===
Club	Based in	Canton	Stadium	Capacity
FC Blue Stars Zürich	Zürich	Zürich	Hardhof	1,000
FC Bodio	Bodio	Ticino	Campo comunale Pollegio	1,000
SC Brühl	St. Gallen	St. Gallen	Paul-Grüninger-Stadion	4,200
FC Locarno	Locarno	Ticino	Stadio comunale Lido	5,000
FC Mendrisio	Mendrisio	Ticino	Centro Sportivo Comunale	4,000
US Pro Daro	Bellinzona	Ticino	Campo Geretta / Stadio Comunale Bellinzona	500 / 5,000
FC Rapid Lugano	Lugano	Ticino	Cornaredo Stadium	6,330
FC Red Star Zürich	Zürich	Zürich	Allmend Brunau	2,000
FC Rorschach	Rorschach	Schwyz	Sportplatz Kellen	1,000
FC St. Gallen	St. Gallen	St. Gallen	Espenmoos	11,000
FC Uster|	Uster	Zürich	Sportanlage Buchholz	7,000
FC Wil	Wil	St. Gallen	Sportpark Bergholz	6,048

=== Final league table ===
Pos	Team	Pld	W	D	L	GF	GA	GD	Pts	Qualification or relegation
1	FC Blue Stars Zürich	22	14	5	3	67	28	+39	33	Play-off for promotion
2	FC St. Gallen	22	11	9	2	41	27	+14	31	
3	SC Brühl	22	10	8	4	40	30	+10	28	
4	FC Red Star Zürich	22	10	3	9	39	26	+13	23	
5	FC Rapid Lugano	22	9	4	9	33	44	−11	22	
6	FC Locarno	22	6	9	7	39	48	−9	21	
7	FC Mendrisio	22	7	6	9	38	50	−12	20	
8	FC Bodio	22	7	5	10	37	33	+4	19	
9	US Pro Daro	22	6	6	10	31	39	−8	18	
10	FC Wil	22	5	7	10	26	35	−9	17	
11	FC Uster	22	5	6	11	25	37	−12	16	Decider for twelfth place
12	FC Rorschach	22	5	6	11	23	42	−19	16	Decider for twelfth place

Source: rsssf
Rules for classification: 1) Points; 2) Goal difference within the league, but decider play-off for qualifiers.

=== Decider for twelfth place ===
The decider was played on 8 June in Wintertur.

Team 1	Score	Team 2
Rorschach	1–1 (a.e.t.)	Uster

The replay was also played in Wintertur on 15 June 1958.

Team 1	Score	Team 2
Uster	3–2	Rorschach

Uster win and continue in the play-outs. Rorschach are directly relegated to 2. Liga Interregional.

== Promotion, relegation ==
=== Promotion play-off ===
The play-off matches were played on 8, 15 and 22 June 1958.

Pos	Team	Pld	W	D	L	GF	GA	GD	Pts	Qualification	VEV	AAR	BSZ
1	Vevey Sports	2	2	0	0	4	0	+4	4	Champions	—	—	3–0
2	FC Aarau	2	1	0	1	1	1	0	2	Promoted	0–1	—	—
3	FC Blue Stars Zürich	2	0	0	2	0	4	−4	0		—	0–1	—

Source: rsssf
Rules for classification: 1) Points; 2) Head-to-head 3) Decider.

Vevey Sports became 1. Liga champions and together with FC Aarau were promoted to 1958–59 Nationalliga B.

=== Relegation play-out ===
The play-out matches were played on 8 and 22 June 1958.

Pos	Team	Pld	W	D	L	GF	GA	GD	Pts	Qualification	UST	BAD	TdP
1	FC Uster	1	1	0	0	3	1	+2	2		—	—	3–1
2	FC Baden	1	1	0	0	1	0	+1	2		n/p	—	—
3	CS La Tour-de-Peilz	2	0	0	2	1	4	−3	0	Relegation	—	0–1	—

Source: rsssf
Rules for classification: 1) Points; 2) Head-to-head 3) Decider.

The match FC Baden–Uster was not played, both teams remain in division. As fourth and final team La Tour-de-Peilz were relegated to 2. Liga.

== Further in Swiss football ==
- 1957–58 Nationalliga A
- 1957–58 Nationalliga B
- 1957–58 Swiss Cup

== Sources ==
- Switzerland 1957–58 at RSSSF

Preceded by 1956–57	Seasons in Swiss 1. Liga	Succeeded by 1958–59
