= Fritz Morf =

Swiss footballer (1928–2011)

Personal information
- Full name: Friedrich Morf
- Date of birth: 29 January 1928
- Date of death: 30 June 2011 (aged 83)
- Place of death: Burgdorf, Switzerland
- Height: 1.77 m (5 ft 10 in)
- Position: Defender

Senior career*
Years	Team	Apps	(Gls)
- FC Grenchen

International career
1957–1962	Switzerland	7	(0)
- * Club domestic league appearances and goals

Friedrich "Fritz" Morf (29 January 1928 – 30 June 2011) was a Swiss football defender who played for Switzerland in the 1962 FIFA World Cup. He also played for FC Grenchen.
