= Eugen Meier (composer) =

Swiss composer

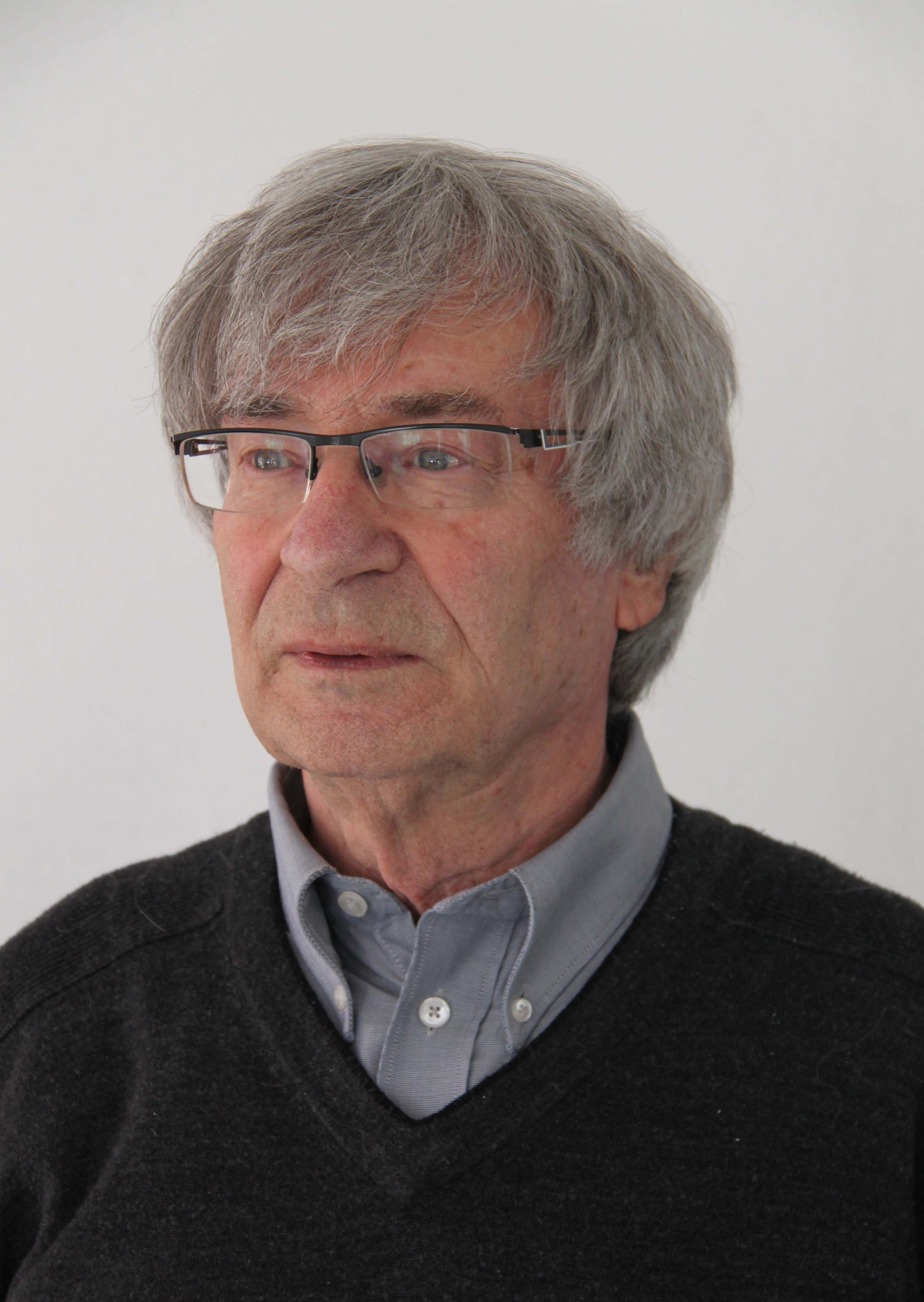
Eugen Meier

Eugen Meier (born 18 June 1934) is a Swiss composer and conductor. He was born in Würenlingen.
