= Werner Leimgruber =

Swiss footballer (1934–2025)

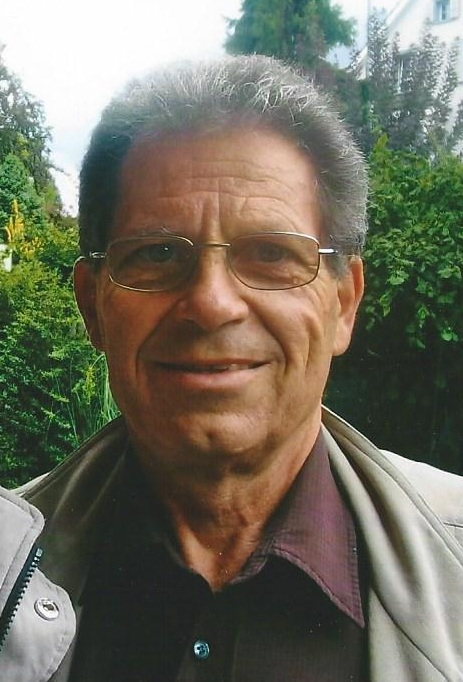

Personal information
- Date of birth: 2 September 1934
- Date of death: 2 January 2025 (aged 90)
- Height: 1.75 m (5 ft 9 in)
- Position: Defender

Senior career*
Years	Team	Apps	(Gls)
1957–1966	FC Zürich		

International career
1963–1966	Switzerland	10	(0)
- * Club domestic league appearances and goals

Werner Leimgruber (2 September 1934 – 2 January 2025) was a Swiss footballer who played as a defender for FC Zürich. He made 10 appearances for the Switzerland national team, also playing in the 1966 FIFA World Cup. Leimgruber died on 2 January 2025, at the age of 90.
