= Ferdinando Riva =

Swiss footballer (1930-2014)

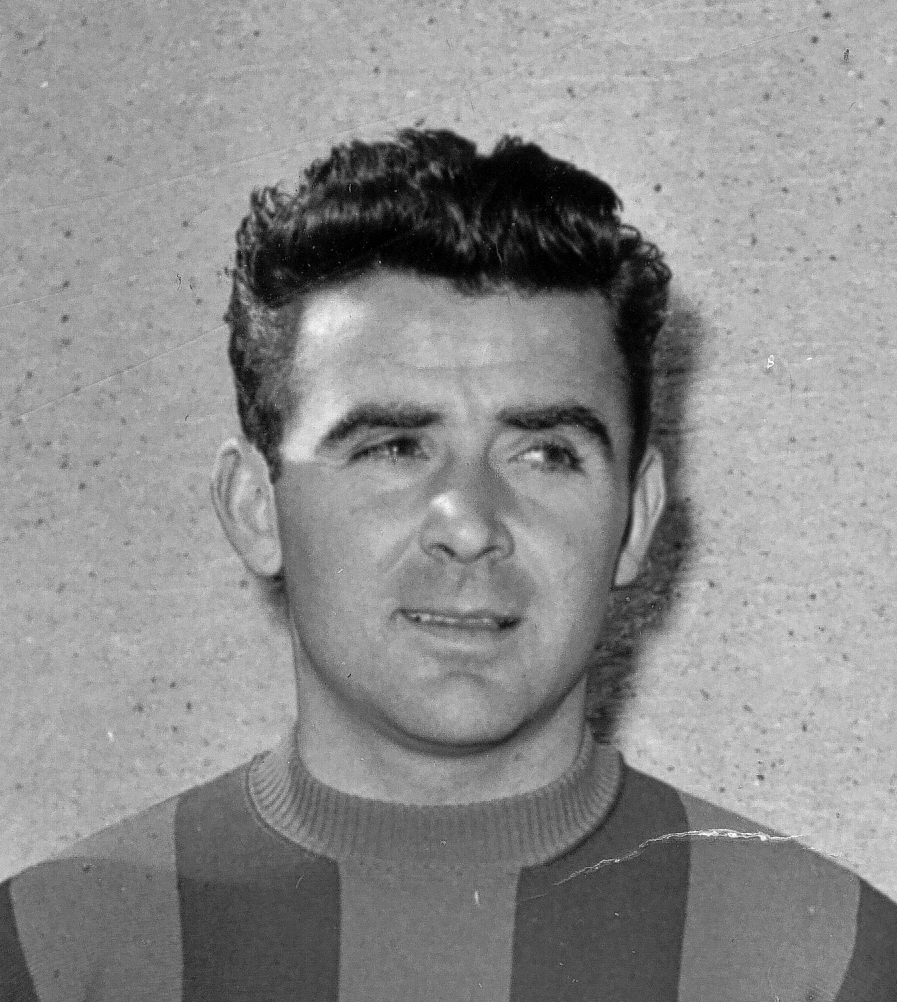

Personal information
- Date of birth: 3 July 1930
- Place of birth: Coldrerio, Switzerland
- Date of death: 15 August 2014 (aged 84)
- Position: Forward

Senior career*
Years	Team	Apps	(Gls)
1947–1950	FC Mendrisio-Stabio		
1950–1970	FC Chiasso	448	(183)

International career
1951–1960	Switzerland	22	(8)
- * Club domestic league appearances and goals

Ferdinando Riva (3 July 1930 – 15 August 2014) was a Swiss football forward who played for Switzerland in the 1954 FIFA World Cup. He also played for FC Mendrisio-Stabio and FC Chiasso.
