= FC Grenchen =

Swiss football club

- Full name: Football Club de Grenchen
- Founded: 1906
- Ground: Stadium Brühl; Grenchen, Switzerland
- Capacity: 15,100 (2,100 seated)
- Chairman: Rolf Bieri
- League: 2. Liga (SOFV)
- 2015/16: 2. Liga interregional (Group 5), 14th, relegated
- Website: http://www.fcg.ch/
Home colours	Away colours

FC Grenchen is a Swiss football club, based in Grenchen. They currently play in the 2. Liga, and play their matches at the Brühl Stadium.

== History ==
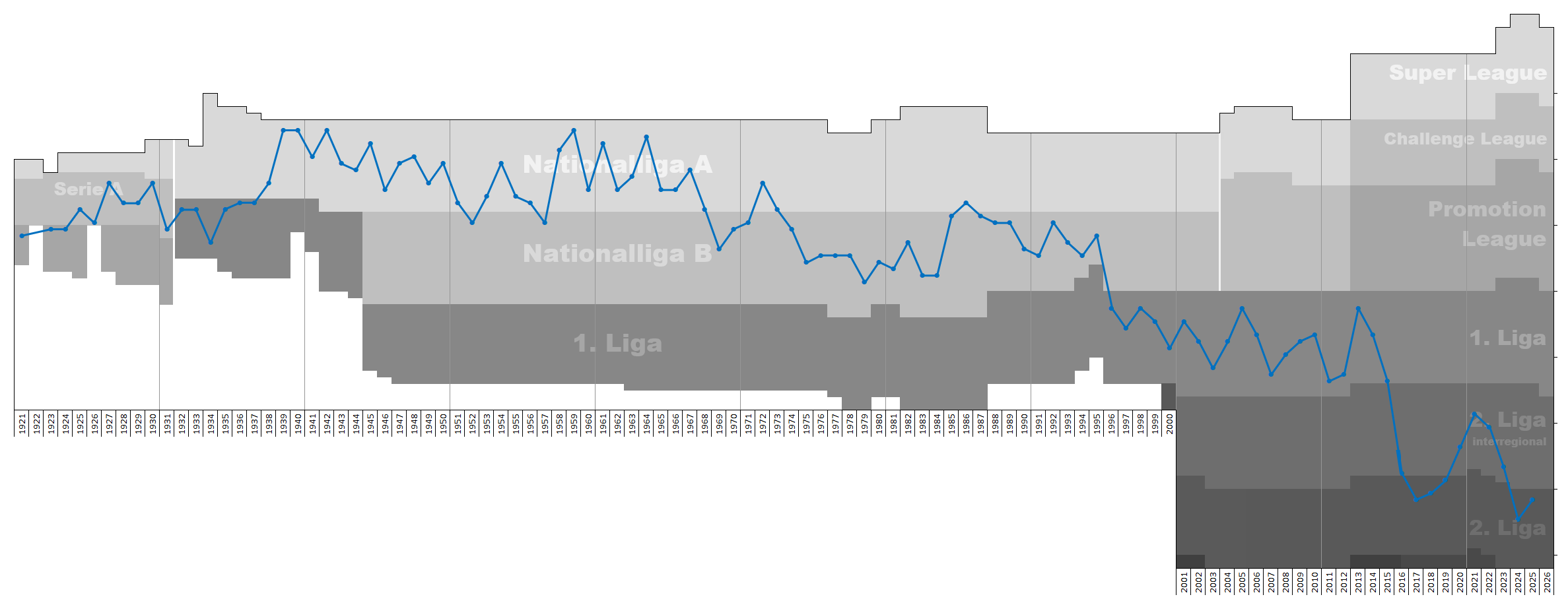
Chart of FC Grenchen table positions in the Swiss football league system

FC Grenchen was founded in 1906. In 1937 they gained promotion to the top league of Swiss football, Nationalliga A, in these inter-war years they came runners-up in this league three times, and runner up in the cup, but their biggest success came post-war coming second in the league one further time and winning the cup in 1959.

They were relegated from the top flight in 1986, and played in Nationalliga B until 1995 when they were relegated to the 1st Liga., where they currently play. They won the Swiss Cup in 1959.

After a poor season in 2014, the team replaced many of its players.

== Stadium ==
Brühl Stadium is the biggest in the Canton of Solothurn. It comprises a space for 13,000 standing and a grandstand with 1,300 covered seats and 800 uncovered seats.

== Current squad ==
Note: Flags indicate national team as defined under FIFA eligibility rules; some limited exceptions apply. Players may hold more than one non-FIFA nationality.

No.	Pos.	Nation	Player
1	GK	SUI	Jeffrey Grosjean
25	GK	ITA	Daniele Persichini
2	DF	FRA	Diako Safari
3	DF	SUI	Damir Dzombic
79	DF	SUI	Adrian Rawyler
22	DF	SUI	Waylon Grosjean
5	DF	SUI	Marc Du Buisson
7	DF	BRA	Raphael Ferreira
13	DF	CMR	Vincent Ekoman
88	MF	BRA	Leandro Moreira
9	MF	DOM	Samuel Zayas
11	MF	BRA	Luan Nascimento
20	MF	MAR	Wassim Riahi

No.	Pos.	Nation	Player
18	MF	SUI	Dominique Sutter
22	MF	ARM	Sergei Bagdasarian
29	MF	FRA	Isaac Bamele
11	MF	ITA	Luca Persichini
28	MF	MAR	Mehdi Mimzil
14	MF	CMR	Mathurin Ndo'Zé
15	MF	KOS	Korab Januzai
23	MF	KOS	Alban Mulaj
8	MF	MKD	Kliment Nastoski
10	FW	BUL	Maryan Andonov
16	FW	SUI	Jari Egeschwyler
17	FW	SUI	Syart Bala

== Uhrencup ==
The Uhrencup is a pre-season football tournament hosted annually by FC Grenchen since 1962 (with the exception of 1967 and 1974), and is the oldest such tournament in Switzerland. They have won this tournament six times.

== Honours ==
- Nationalliga A
  - Runners-up (4): 1938–39, 1939–40, 1941–42, 1958–59
- Schweizer Cup:
  - Winners (1): 1958–59
  - Runners-up (2): 1939–40, 1947–48, 1959–60

== Former players ==
- See Category:FC Grenchen players
