= Stadion Brühl =

Football stadium in Switzerland

- Interactive map of Stadion Brühl
- Location: Grenchen, Canton of Solothurn, Switzerland
- Coordinates: 47.185409°N 7.404031°E
- Owner: City of Grenchen
- Capacity: 10,964
- Field size: 105 x 72 m

Construction
- Opened: 4 September 1927

Stadion Brühl is a football stadium at Grenchen in the Canton of Solothurn, Switzerland. It is the home ground of FC Grenchen since 1927. Its maximum capacity is 10,964.

The annual Uhrencup tournament is held there. And the Swiss Bowl championship final game of the Nationalliga A (American football) has been held since 2022.

== See also ==
- List of football stadiums in Switzerland
