= ES FC Malley =

Swiss football club

ES FC Malley LS
- Full name: Étoile Sportive FC Malley Lausanne
- Nickname(s): Malley
- Founded: 1927
- Ground: Centre Sportif de la Tuilière
- Capacity: 1500
- Manager: Paulo Diogo
Home colours	Away colours

Etoile Sportive Football Club Malley, known as Malley is a football club from Malley, Switzerland. Various club teams train in the vast arena of Blécherette, based in the north of the city. The training center also serves as the headquarters of the club.

The club was founded in 1927, is currently playing in the Swiss 2.Liga (Regional Level).

== History ==
- 1927: Foundation of the club that bears the name of a district of Lausanne.
- 1942: The field of Factory Gas in Malley leaves room for slaughterhouses, the club must emigrate to Renens.
- 1945: The club settled permanently in the heights of the city of Lausanne and took possession of Stade du Bois-Gentil.

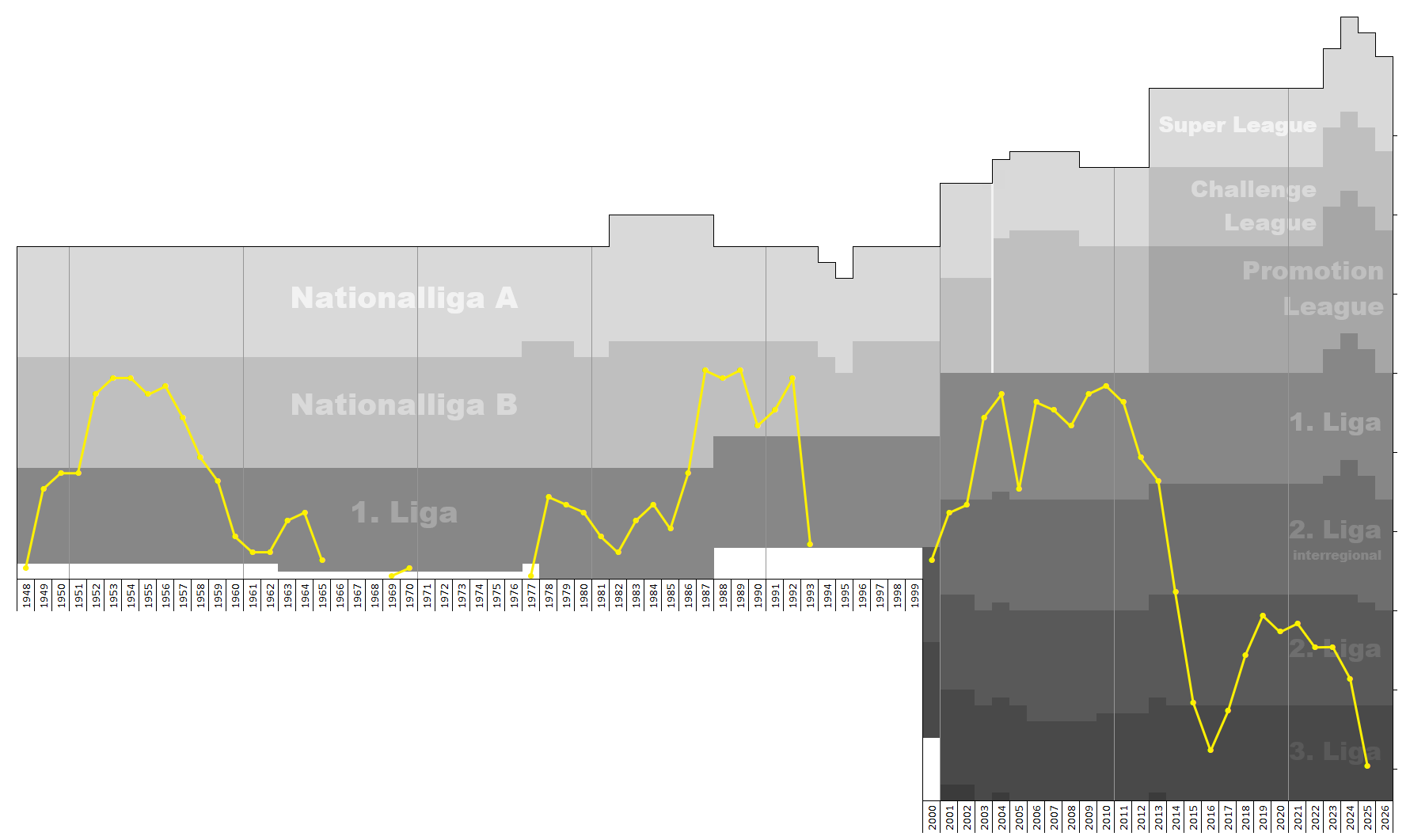
Chart of ES FC Malley table positions in the Swiss football league system

=== Stadium ===
Since moving the club in 1945, the first team of ES FC Malley LS plays in the "Stade du Bois-Gentil". With a capacity of 3,500 (including 500 seats), it has the distinction of having kept its historic grandstand origin until 2018. Now they play at Centre Sportif de la Tuilière.

=== Training Center ===
The training center of the ES FC Malley LS is called the "Centre Sportif de la Tuilière".
