= Eugen Meier (footballer) =

Swiss footballer (1930-2002)

Personal information
- Full name: Eugen Meier
- Date of birth: 30 April 1930
- Place of birth: Schaffhausen, Switzerland
- Date of death: 26 March 2002 (aged 71)
- Height: 1.78 m (5 ft 10 in)
- Position: Forward

Senior career*
Years	Team	Apps	(Gls)
- FC Schaffhausen
- Young Boys
- FC Bern

International career
1953–1962	Switzerland	42	(3)
- * Club domestic league appearances and goals

Eugen Meier (30 April 1930 – 26 March 2002) was a Swiss footballer who played as a forward.

During his club career he played for FC Schaffhausen and BSC Young Boys. He earned 42 caps and scored three goals for the Switzerland national team from 1953 to 1962, and participated in the 1954 FIFA World Cup and the 1962 FIFA World Cup.
