= 1938–39 FC Basel season =

FC Basel 1938–39 football season

FC Basel
1938–39 season
- Chairman: Emil Junker
- First team coach: Fernand Jaccard
- Ground: Landhof, Basel
- Nationalliga: 12th (relegated)
- Swiss Cup: Round 2
- Top goalscorer: League: Eduard Buser (11); All: Eduard Buser (11)
- Highest home attendance: 5,000 on 16 April 1939 vs Nordstern Basel and on 19 May 1939 vs Lugano
- Lowest home attendance: 3,000 on 4 September 1938 vs La Chaux-de-Fonds and on 2 October 1938 vs Biel-Bienne and on 27 November 1938 vs Grenchen and on 18 December 1938 vs Grasshopper Club
- Average home league attendance: 3,681

The FC Basel 1938–39 season was the forty-sixth season since the club's foundation on 15 November 1893. FC Basel played their home games in the Landhof in the district Wettstein in Kleinbasel. Emil Junker was the club chairman and it was his third consecutive season as club president. The club had financial and sporting problems over the previous few years and these continued this season.

== Overview ==
According to statements in the 75th anniversary book written years later by author Jules Düblin (ex-player and ex-club chairman) the club had problems with the Swiss Football Association (SFA). The club was also having financial problems and these problems continued this season. The club suffered under the results of this confrontation with the SFA. These were mainly due to the transfer of the player Numa Monnard, who at the start of the season returned to his former club Cantonal Neuchatel.

Fernand Jaccard who had been Basel's player-manager the previous season, continued for the club in the same position this season. Basel played a total of 29 matches in their 1938–39 season. 22 of these matches were in the Nationalliga, two in the Swiss Cup and five were friendly matches. Of these five friendlies two were played at home in the Landhof and the other three were also in Switzerland. Two friendly games were won, two drawn and one ended in a defeat.

12 teams contested the 1938–39 Nationalliga championship, which was played as a round-robin, one team to be relegated. Despite the fact that the players were well prepared for the season, as Düblin wrote in his summary, sportingly the season was very bad. Despite two victories over the two top clubs that season, Grasshopper Club and Grenchen, one catastrophic game followed the other. Of the 22 domestic league games only five ended with a win, 12 were defeats. The team ended in last position, two points behind Biel-Bienne and the Young Boys. Basel was relegated for the first time in the club history into the newly reorganized 1.Liga.

In the first principal round of the Swiss Cup Basel were drawn at home against lower tier local rivals Concordia Basel and won 3–2. In the second round Basel were also drawn at home against a lower-tier team, but Brühl St. Gallen proved to be a strong competitor and Basel were defeated 1–3. and were thrown out of the competition.

== Players ==
The following is the list of the Basel first team squad during the season 1938–39. The list includes players that were in the squad the day the season started on 24 July 1938 but subsequently left the club after that date.

Note: Flags indicate national team as defined under FIFA eligibility rules; some limited exceptions apply. Players may hold more than one non-FIFA nationality.

No.	Pos.	Nation	Player
—	GK	SUI	Eugène de Kalbermatten
—	GK	SUI	Fritz Glaser
—	GK	SUI	Kurt Imhof
—	DF	SUI	Henri Bernard
—	DF	SUI	Robert Büchi
—	DF	SUI	Louis Favre
—	DF	SUI	Ernst Grauer
—	MF	SUI	Ernst Hufschmid
—	DF	SUI	Heinrich Diethelm
—	DF	SUI	Heinz Elsässer
—	MF	SUI	August Ibach
—	MF	SUI	Fernand Jaccard

No.	Pos.	Nation	Player
—	MF	SUI	Albert Mohler
—	MF	FRG	Franz Sattler
—	MF	SUI	Fritz Schmidlin (I)
—	MF	SUI	Guglielmo Spadini
—	MF	SUI	Eduard Zuber
—	FW	SUI	? Bossoni
—	FW	SUI	Eduard Buser
—	FW	SUI	Maurice Dubosson
—	FW	SUI	Eduard Irniger
—	FW	SUI	Alex Mathys
—	FW	SUI	Othmar Saner
—	FW	SUI	René Schaller
—	FW	SUI	Walter Zürrer

Players who left the squad

Note: Flags indicate national team as defined under FIFA eligibility rules; some limited exceptions apply. Players may hold more than one non-FIFA nationality.

No.	Pos.	Nation	Player
—	DF	GER	Emil Hummel
—	MF	SUI	Caspar Monigatti

No.	Pos.	Nation	Player
—	FW	SUI	Numa Monnard
—	FW	SUI	Alfons Weber (II)

== Results ==
=== Legend ===
Win Draw Loss Postponed

=== Friendly matches ===
==== Pre-season ====
24 July 1938 Pre-season	Basel (Switzerland)	4–1	(Switzerland) Biel-Bienne	Im Teichboden Oftringen
	Buser (1:0); Ibach (2:0); Schaller (3:1); Spadini (4:1)	Summary	(2:1)	Attendance: 300

1 August 1938 Pre-season	Basel (Switzerland)	5–2	(Switzerland) La Chaux-de-Fonds	Landhof, Basel
17:30	Spadini (2x); Monigatti (1x); Ibach (1x); Buser (1x)	Summary	(2x) Bösch	Attendance: 1,000; Referee: (Switzerland) H. Neumann Basel

21 August 1938 Pre-season	Basel (Switzerland)	2–2	(West Germany) Freiburger FC	Landhof, Basel
17:00	Buser (1:1); Ibach (2:1)	Summary	(0:1) Beha (2:2) Beha	Attendance: 1,000; Referee: (Switzerland) Karl Wunderlin Basel

28 August 1938 Pre-season	Young Boys (Switzerland)	4–4	(Switzerland) Basel	Wankdorf Stadium, Bern
	Bickel (2x); Sydler (1x); Lukacs (1x)	Summary	(2x) Schmidlin (I) (1x) Spadini (1x) Ibach	Attendance: 1,800; Referee: (Switzerland) Gerber Bern

==== Mid-season ====
6 November 1938 Mid-season	La Chaux-de-Fonds (Switzerland)	1–0	(Switzerland) Basel	Stade Charrière, La Chaux-de-Fonds
15:00	Trachsel 80' (1:0)	Summary		Attendance: 2,000; Referee: (Switzerland) Sandoz La Chaux-de-Fonds

=== Nationalliga ===
==== League matches ====
4 September 1938 Round 1	Basel	2–2	La Chaux-de-Fonds	Landhof, Basel
15:00	Zuber (1x); Grauer (1x)	Summary	(1x) Messerli (1x) Schweizer	Attendance: 3,000; Referee: (Switzerland) Grassi Balerna

11 September 1938 Round 2	Grasshopper Club	4–0	Basel	Hardturm, Zürich
15:00	Bickel 28' (1:0); Fauguel 61' (2:0); Rupf 73' (3:0); Bickel 75' (4:0)	Summary		Attendance: 3,000; Referee: (Switzerland) Scherz Bern

25 September 1938 Round 3	Basel	4–1	Luzern	Landhof, Basel
15:00	Buser (4x)	Summary	(1x) Semp	Attendance: 3,500; Referee: (Switzerland) Spengler Olten

2 October 1936 Round 4	Basel	0–0	Biel-Bienne	Landhof, Basel
15:00		Summary		Attendance: 3,000; Referee: (Switzerland) Gerber Bern

9 October 1938 Round 5	Servette	2–1	Basel	Charmilles Stadium, Geneva
	Aeby 7' (1:0); Trello 88' (2:1)	Summary	73' (1:1) Jaccard	Attendance: 3,000; Referee: (Switzerland) Jaggi Bern

26 October 1938 Round 6	Basel	0–0	Young Boys	Landhof, Basel
15:00		Summary		Attendance: 4,500; Referee: (Switzerland) Allemann Biel/Bienne

23 October 1938 Round 9	Nordstern Basel	4–1	Basel	Stadion Rankhof, Basel
15:00	Burkhardt (2x); Büche (1x); Forelli (1x)	Summary	(1x) Ibach	Attendance: 6,000; Referee: (Switzerland) Spengler Olten

30 October 1938 Round 7	Lugano	1–0	Basel	Campo Marzio, Lugano
	Forni 18' (1:0)	Summary		Attendance: 2,000; Referee: (Switzerland) Scherz Bern

13 November 1938 Round 8	Basel	0–1	Young Fellows Zürich	Landhof, Basel
14:30		Summary	(0:1) Häfeli	Attendance: 3,500; Referee: (Switzerland) Lutz Geneva

27 November 1938 Round 10	Basel	2–0	Grenchen	Landhof, Basel
14:30	Grauer 4' (1:0); Dubosson (2:0)	Summary		Attendance: 3,000; Referee: (Switzerland) Spengler Olten

4 December 1938 Round 11	Lausanne-Sport	2–0	Basel	Olympique de la Pontaise, Lausanne
14:30	Rochat 20' (1:0); Spagnoli 40' (2:0)	Summary		Attendance: 2,000; Referee: (Switzerland) Scherz Bern

11 December 1938 Round 12	La Chaux-de-Fonds	2–0	Basel	Stade Charrière, La Chaux-de-Fonds
14:30	Volentik (1:0); Wagner 30' (2:0)	Summary		Attendance: 3,000; Referee: (Switzerland) Gerber Bern

18 December 1938 Round 13	Basel	3–1	Grasshopper Club	Landhof, Basel
14:30	Buser (2x); Ibach (1x)	Summary	(1x) Nausch	Attendance: 3,000; Referee: (Switzerland) Grassi Balerna

22 January 1939 Round 15	Biel-Bienne	4–1	Basel	Gurzelen Stadion, Biel/Bienne
	Frangi (1:0); Frangi (2:0); Weber 60' (3:0); Tineli 85' (4:1)	Summary	75' (3:1) Spadini	Attendance: 2,000; Referee: (Switzerland) Wittwer Geneva

19 February 1939 Round 14	Luzern	4–3	Basel	Stadion Allmend, Luzern
	Karcher 21' (1:1); 34' (o.g. 2:2); Karcher 37' (3:2); Gloor 74' (4:2)	Summary	17' (0:1) Buser; 25' (1:2) Buser; 85' (4:3) Sattler	Attendance: 3,000; Referee: (Switzerland) Wittwer Geneva

26 February 1939 Round 16	Basel	0–1	Servette	Landhof, Basel
15:00		Summary	63' (0:1) Walaschek	Attendance: 3,500; Referee: (Switzerland) Scherz Bern

12 March 1939 Round 17	Young Boys	1–1	Basel	Wankdorf Stadium, Bern
	Halblinker (red card) 20'; Fish 82' (1:1)	Summary	80' (0:1) Ibach; (red card) 85' Schmidlin (I)	Attendance: 3,500; Referee: (Switzerland) Spengler Olten

19 March 1939 Round 18	Basel	PP	Lugano	Landhof, Basel
		[ Summary]

26 March 1935 Round 19	Young Fellows Zürich	1–1	Basel	Letzigrund, Zürich
20:00	Kielholz 56' (1:1)	Summary	49' (o.g. 0:1) Maag	Attendance: 2,500; Referee: (Switzerland) Gerber Bern

15 April 1935 Round 20	Basel	0–1	Nordstern Basel	Landhof, Basel
15:00		Summary	(0:1) Büche	Attendance: 5,000; Referee: (Switzerland) Lutz Geneva

23 April 1939 Round 21	Grenchen	3–2	Basel	Stadion Brühl, Grenchen
	(o.g. 1:1); Artimovicz (2:2); Artimovicz (3:2)	Summary	(0:1) Ibach (1:2) Buser	Attendance: 2,000; Referee: (Switzerland) Grassi Balerna

30 April 1939 Round 22	Basel	1–0	Lausanne-Sport	Landhof, Basel
15:00	Mathys 77' (1:0)	Summary		Attendance: 3,500; Referee: (Switzerland) Jaggi Bern

18 May 1939 Round 18	Basel	7–0	Lugano	Landhof, Basel
14:45	Ibach (2x); Buser (2x); Schmidlin (I) (1x); Mathys (1x); Bernard (1x)	Summary		Attendance: 5,000; Referee: (Switzerland) Wittwer Geneva

==== League table ====
Pos	Team	Pld	W	D	L	GF	GA	GD	Pts	Qualification
1	Grasshopper Club	22	12	7	3	34	20	+14	31	Swiss Champions
2	Grenchen	22	10	7	5	38	30	+8	27	
3	Lugano	22	11	5	6	29	23	+6	27	
4	Servette	22	11	4	7	43	28	+15	26	
5	Nordstern Basel	22	8	7	7	29	24	+5	23	
6	Lausanne-Sport	22	8	6	8	34	28	+6	22	Swiss Cup winners
7	La Chaux-de-Fonds	22	9	4	9	29	41	−12	22	
8	Luzern	22	7	5	10	42	45	−3	19	
9	Young Fellows Zürich	22	6	6	10	29	31	−2	18	
10	Young Boys	22	4	9	9	22	35	−13	17	
11	Biel-Bienne	22	4	9	9	22	39	−17	17	
12	Basel	22	5	5	12	29	36	−7	15	Relegated

Source: rsssf.com

=== Swiss Cup ===
The teams from this season's Nationalliga, who had received byes for the first three rounds, entered the cup competition in the fourth round. These teams were seeded and could not be drawn against each other.

8 January 1939 Round 4	Basel	3–2	Concordia Basel	Landhof, Basel
14:30	Sattler 30' (1:1); Ibach 48' (2:1); Ibach 60' (3:1)	FCB summary	12' (0:1) Martignoli; 76' (3:2) Rufer	Attendance: 3,500; Referee: (Switzerland) Hans Wüthrich (Bern)
Note: Concordia played the 1938/39 season in the 1. Liga (second tier), they waivered home-advantage and the game was played in FC Basel's home stadium.

29 January 1939 Round 2	Basel	1–3	SC Brühl St. Gallen	Landhof, Basel
14:30	Schmidlin (I) (1:1)	FCB summary	(0:1) Spengler (1:2) Joris; 26' (1:3) Spengler	Attendance: 2,500; Referee: (Switzerland) Mario Grassi (Balerna)
Note: Brühl played the 1938/39 season in the 1. Liga (second tier).

== See also ==
- History of FC Basel
- List of FC Basel players
- List of FC Basel seasons

== Sources ==
- Rotblau: Jahrbuch Saison 2014/2015. Publisher: FC Basel Marketing AG. ISBN 978-3-7245-2027-6
- Die ersten 125 Jahre. Publisher: Josef Zindel im Friedrich Reinhardt Verlag, Basel. ISBN 978-3-7245-2305-5
- FCB team 1938/39 at fcb-archiv.ch
- Switzerland 1938/39 by Erik Garin at Rec.Sport.Soccer Statistics Foundation
