= 1937–38 FC Basel season =

FC Basel
1937–38 season
- Chairman: Emil Junker
- Trainer / Player-manager: Fernand Jaccard
- Ground: Landhof, Basel
- Nationalliga: 4th
- Swiss Cup: Round 3
- Top goalscorer: League: Numa Monnard (20); All: Numa Monnard (28)
- Highest home attendance: 4,500 on 27 February 1938 vs Grasshopper Club and on 15 May 1938 vs Young Boys
- Lowest home attendance: 2,498 on 29 August 1937 vs Young Fellows Zürich
- Average home league attendance: 3,499

The FC Basel 1937–38 season was the forty-fifth season since the club's foundation on 15 November 1893. FC Basel played their home games in the Landhof in the district Wettstein in Kleinbasel. Emil Junker was the club chairman and it was his second consecutive season as president.

== Overview ==
Fernand Jaccard who had taken over as first team coach during the previous season stayed on as player-manager this season. Basel played a total of 33 matches in their 1937–38 season. 22 of these matches were in the Nationalliga, three in the Swiss Cup and eight were friendly matches. Of the eight friendlies, six were played at home in the Landhof, one in Espenmoos as guests to FC St. Gallen and one as guests to Le Havre AC in the north of France. Basel won four friendlies, drew one and lost three.

The number of teams in the 1937–38 Nationalliga was reduced by one team compared to the previous season. Thus 12 teams contested the championship this year, which was played as a round-robin, one team to be relegated and only one promoted from the two 1. Liga groups. Basel played an even and consistent season. 22 league games in total, 12 of them ended with a victory, three ended in a draw and the team suffered seven defeats. With 27 points Basel ended the season in fourth position, three points less than Lugano who became Swiss champions.

The young forward Numa Monnard, who had transferred in at the beginning of the season from Cantonal Neuchatel, was the team's top goal scorer. With 20 goals he was the Nationalliga top scorer as well. He played 21 league games and in each of his first eight games he scored at least one goal. In the league match against Lausanne-Sport on 12 September 1937 he scored a hat-trick as Basel won by four goals to nil. In total, including cup and friendlies, Monnard played 29 games for Basel, in which he netted 34 times.

In the 1st principal round of the Swiss Cup, as Basel played against lower tier FC Breite, Monard scored five times. In the next cup round Monard scored a hat-trick against Bellinzona. However, in the round of 16 Basel lost 0–1 against Grasshopper Club, who then proceeded and eventually won the cup.

== Players ==
The following is the list of the Basel first team squad during the season 1937–38. The list includes players that were in the squad the day the season started on 15 August 1937 but subsequently left the club after that date.

Note: Flags indicate national team as defined under FIFA eligibility rules; some limited exceptions apply. Players may hold more than one non-FIFA nationality.

No.	Pos.	Nation	Player
—	GK	SUI	Eugène de Kalbermatten
—	GK	SUI	Fritz Glaser
—	DF	SUI	Robert Büchi
—	DF	SUI	Louis Favre
—	DF	SUI	Ernst Grauer
—	MF	SUI	Ernst Hufschmid
—	DF	GER	Emil Hummel
—	DF	SUI	Heinz Elsässer
—	MF	SUI	August Ibach
—	MF	SUI	Fernand Jaccard

No.	Pos.	Nation	Player
—	MF	SUI	Caspar Monigatti
—	MF	FRG	Franz Sattler
—	MF	SUI	Fritz Schmidlin (I)
—	MF	SUI	Guglielmo Spadini
—	MF	SUI	Eduard Zuber
—	FW	SUI	Eduard Buser
—	FW	SUI	Numa Monnard
—	FW	SUI	Othmar Saner
—	FW	SUI	René Schaller
—	FW	SUI	Alfons Weber (II)

Players who left the squad

Note: Flags indicate national team as defined under FIFA eligibility rules; some limited exceptions apply. Players may hold more than one non-FIFA nationality.

No.	Pos.	Nation	Player
—	GK	SUI	Ernst Kipfer
—	DF	SUI	Heinrich Diethelm
—	MF	SUI	Paul Schaub
—	MF	SUI	Ferdinand Spichiger

No.	Pos.	Nation	Player
—	FW	SUI	Enrico Ardizzoia
—	FW	AUT	Josef Artimovicz
—	FW	SUI	Maurice Dubosson
—	FW	AUT	Gottfried Havlicek

== Results ==
=== Legend ===
Win Draw Loss Postponed

=== Friendly matches ===
==== Pre- and mid-season ====
1937 Pre-season	Basel (Switzerland)	2–2	(Belgium) Daring Club de Bruxelles	Landhof, Basel
	Goal	Summary	Goal	Attendance: 1,558

15 August 1937 Pre-season	Basel (Switzerland)	1–2	(West Germany) Freiburger FC	Landhof, Basel
17:00	Monnard	Summary	(2x) Flöhl	Attendance: 1,800; Referee: (Switzerland) Karl Wunderlin Basel

21 August 1937 Pre-season	Basel (Switzerland)	4–2	(Switzerland) Young Boys	Landhof, Basel
17:00	Monnard (2x); Spadini (1x); Ibach (1x)	Summary	(1x) Bacher (1x) Lukacs	Attendance: 1,500; Referee: (Switzerland) H. Neumann Basel

13 November 1937 Mid-season	Basel (Switzerland)	7–2	(Hungary) South Hungarian XI	Landhof, Basel
14:30	Saner (2x); Spadini (2x); Hufschmid (2x); Schaller (1x)	Summary	(2x) Földesi	Attendance: 1,000; Referee: (Switzerland) Karl Wunderlin Basel

==== Winter break to end of season ====
1 January 1938 Winter break	Basel (Switzerland)	1–2	(Austria) SK Admira Wien	Landhof, Basel
14:30	Spadini (1:0)	Summary	(1:1) Schall (1:2) Stoiber	Attendance: 2,500; Referee: (Switzerland) H. Neumann Basel

13 March 1938 Mid-season	St. Gallen (Switzerland)	3–2	(Switzerland) Basel	Espenmoos, St. Gallen
	Holenstein (II) 65' (1:2); Saxenhammer 82' (2:2); Holenstein (II) (3:2)	Summary	5' (0:1) Weber; 13' (0:2) Monigatti	Attendance: 600; Referee: (Switzerland) Meier St. Gallen

6 June 1938 End of season	Le Havre AC (West Germany)	3–5	(Switzerland) Basel	Terrain des Havre AC, Le Havre
	(1:1) (2:1) (3:2)	Summary	(0:1) Ibach (2:2) Spadini (3:3) Weber; 75' (3:4) Weber (4:5) Monnard	Attendance: 6,000

12 June 1938 End of season	Basel (Switzerland)	6–3	(France) Metz	Landhof, Basel
	Spadini 20' (1:1); Ibach 39' (2:2); Monnard 44' (3:2); Spadini 55' (4:2); Monnard 81' (5:3); Ibach (pen. 6:3)	Summary	(0:1) (1:2) (o.g. 4:3) Elsässer	Attendance: 500; Referee: (Switzerland)

=== Nationalliga ===
==== League matches ====
29 August 1937 Round 1	Basel	1–0	Young Fellows Zürich	Landhof, Basel
16:00	Monnard 80' (1:0)	Summary		Attendance: 2,498; Referee: (Switzerland) Allemann Biel/Bienne

5 September 1937 Round 2	Biel-Bienne	1–3	Basel	Gurzelen Stadion, Biel/Bienne
	Baur (pen. 1:2)	Summary	12' (0:1) Saner (0:2) Monnard (1:3) Schaller	Attendance: 1,700; Referee: (Switzerland) Hans Wüthrich Bern

12 September 1937 Round 3	Basel	4–0	Lausanne-Sport	Landhof, Basel
15:00	Monnard 2' (1:0); Saner 7' (2:0); Monnard (3:0); Monnard (4:0)	Summary		Attendance: 3,500; Referee: (Switzerland) Jaggi Bern

26 September 1937 Round 4	Nordstern Basel	4–2	Basel	Stadion Rankhof, Basel
15:00	Brückler (1x); Mohler (1x); Forelli (1x); Büche (1x)	Summary	(2x) Monnard	Attendance: 8,000; Referee: (Switzerland) Hans Wüthrich Bern

17 October 1937 Round 5	Basel	6–1	FC Bern	Landhof, Basel
15:00	Monnard (2x); Schaller (1x); Saner (1x); Jaccard (1x); Weber (1x)	Summary	(1x) Bärlocher	Attendance: 3,500; Referee: (Switzerland) Meyer Lausanne

24 October 1937 Round 6	Grasshopper Club	4–2	Basel	Hardturm, Zürich
15;00	Wagner 24' (1:1); Bickel 45' (2:1); Bickel 77' (3:1); Wagner 72' (4:1)	Summary	10' (0:1) Monnard; 77' (4:2) Saner	Attendance: 8,500; Referee: (Switzerland) Scherz Bern

21 November 1937 Round 7	Basel	2–2	Grenchen	Landhof, Basel
14:30	Monnard (1x); Weber (1x)	Summary	(2x) Schafroth	Attendance: 3,000; Referee: (Switzerland) Allemann Biel/Bienne

28 November 1937 Round 8	Servette	1–1	Basel	Charmilles Stadium, Geneva
14:30	Walaschek 75' (1:1)	Summary	65' (0:1) Monnard	Attendance: 3,000; Referee: (Switzerland) Hans Wüthrich Bern

12 December 1937 Round 9	Basel	0–2	Lugano	Landhof, Basel
14:30		Summary	(0:1) Amado; 85' (0:2) Peverelli	Attendance: 3,500; Referee: (Switzerland) Spengler Olten

19 December 1937 Round 10	Basel	3–2	Luzern	Landhof, Basel
10:30	Hufschmid (1x); Schaller (1x); Weber (1x)	Summary	(2x) Bammert	Attendance: 3,000; Referee: (Switzerland) Scherz Bern

26 December 1937 Round 11	Young Boys	1–0	Basel	Wankdorf Stadium, Bern
	Lukacs	Summary		Attendance: 3,500; Referee: (Switzerland) Iseli Biel/Bienne

Round 12	Young Fellows Zürich	PP	Basel	Letzigrund, Zürich
		[ Summary]

16 January 1938 Round 13	Basel	2–0	Biel-Bienne	Landhof, Basel
14:30	Schaller (1:0); Monnard (2:0)	Summary		Attendance: 3,000; Referee: (Switzerland) Grassi Bellinzona

23 January 1938 Round 14	Lausanne-Sport	2–3	Basel	Olympique de la Pontaise, Lausanne
14:30	Jäggi 17' (pen. 1:0); Jäggi 78' (2:3)	Summary	19' (o.g. 1:1) Kipfer; 24' (1:3) Monnard; 65' (1:3) Monnard	Attendance: 3,000; Referee: (Switzerland) Jaggi Bern

13 February 1938 Round 15	Basel	1–0	Nordstern Basel	Landhof, Basel
14:30	Ibach 52' (1:0)	Summary		Attendance: 4,000; Referee: (Switzerland) Spengler Olten

20 February 1935 Round 16	FC Bern	2–7	Basel	Neufeld, Bern
	Baumgartner (1x); Billeter (1x)	Summary	(2x) Weber (2x) Monnard (1x) Ibach (1x) Schaller (1x) Buser	Attendance: 2,000; Referee: (Switzerland) Allemann Biel/Bienne

27 February 1938 Round 17	Basel	2–1	Grasshopper Club	Landhof, Basel
14:30	Buser (1:1); Weber 37' (2:1)	Summary	(0:1) Abegglen	Attendance: 4,500; Referee: (Switzerland) Hans Wüthrich Bern

12 March 1938 Round 18	Grenchen	0–2	Basel	Stadion Brühl, Grenchen
		Summary	(0:1) Monnard (0:2) Weber	Attendance: 3,000; Referee: (Switzerland) Spengler Olten

27 March 1938 Round 19	Basel	0–1	Servette	Landhof, Basel
15:00		Summary	65' (0:1) Belli	Attendance: 3,500; Referee: (Switzerland) Jaggi Bern

10 April 1938 Round 20	Lugano	3–0	Basel	Campo Marzio, Lugano
	Bergamin (1:0); Amado (2:0); Amado (3:0)	Summary		Attendance: 3,500; Referee: (Switzerland) Meyer Lausanne

24 April 1938 Round 21	Luzern	1–6	Basel	Stadion Allmend, Luzern
	Karcher (1x)	Summary	(2x) o.g. (2x) Monnard (1x) Spadini (pen. 1x) Schmidlin (I)	Attendance: 2,300; Referee: (Switzerland) Lutz Geneva

15 May 1938 Round 22	Basel	0–0	Young Boys	Landhof, Basel
15:00		Summary		Attendance: 4,500; Referee: (Switzerland) Spengler Olten

29 May 1938 Round 12	Young Fellows Zürich	3–1	Basel	Letzigrund, Zürich
	Kielholz (1:0); Kielholz 14' (2:0); Deriaz 48' (3:1)	Summary	38' (2:1) Buser	Attendance: 1,000; Referee: (Switzerland) Allemann Biel/Bienne

==== League table ====
Pos	Team	Pld	W	D	L	GF	GA	GD	Pts	Qualification
1	FC Lugano	22	12	6	4	46	28	+18	30	Swiss Champions
2	Grasshopper Club Zürich	22	13	3	6	50	26	+24	29	Swiss Cup winners
3	BSC Young Boys	22	11	6	5	39	29	+10	28	
4	FC Basel	22	12	3	7	48	31	+17	27	
5	FC Nordstern Basel	22	11	4	7	32	29	+3	26	
6	Lausanne Sports	22	10	5	7	46	39	+7	25	
7	Servette FC Genève	22	9	7	6	39	34	+5	25	
8	Young Fellows Zürich	22	9	6	7	46	32	+14	24	
9	FC Biel-Bienne	22	6	4	12	23	36	−13	16	
10	FC Grenchen	22	4	7	11	31	51	−20	15	
11	FC Lucerne	22	5	3	14	37	55	−18	13	
12	FC Bern	22	0	6	16	18	65	−47	6	Relegated

Source: rsssf.com

=== Swiss Cup ===
3 October 1937 1st principal round	FC Breite (Basel)	2–10	Basel	Stadion Rankhof, Basel
13:30	Alt 8' (1:0); Alt (2:8)	FCB summary	30' (1:1) Ibach (1:2) Ibach; 41' (1:3) Monnard (1:4) Weber (1:5) Monnard (1:6) Schaller (1:7) Monnard (1:8) Monnard (2:9) Monnard; 90' (2:10) Weber	Attendance: 3,000; Referee: (Switzerland) Hans Enderli (Winterthur)
Note: FC Breite played the 1937/38 season in the 2. Liga (third tier).

7 November 1937 Round 2	Basel	5–1	Bellinzona	Stadion Rankhof, Basel
12:45	Monnard 65' (1:1); Schaller 73' (2:1); Saner 74' (3:1); Monnard 79' (4:1); Monnard 87' (4:1)	FCB summary	35' (0:1) Bernasconi	Attendance: 4,500; Referee: (Switzerland) Marti (Bern)
Note: Bellizona played the 1937/38 season in the 1. Liga (second tier).

5 December 1937 Round 3	Basel	0–1	Grasshopper Club	Landhof, Basel
14:30		FCB summary	10' (0:1) Rupf	Attendance: 7,000; Referee: (Switzerland) Ernest Meyer (Lausanne)
Note: GC played the 1937/38 season in the Nationalliga (top-tier).

== See also ==
- History of FC Basel
- List of FC Basel players
- List of FC Basel seasons

== Sources ==
- Rotblau: Jahrbuch Saison 2014/2015. Publisher: FC Basel Marketing AG. ISBN 978-3-7245-2027-6
- Die ersten 125 Jahre. Publisher: Josef Zindel im Friedrich Reinhardt Verlag, Basel. ISBN 978-3-7245-2305-5
- FCB team 1937/38 at fcb-archiv.ch
- Switzerland 1937/38 by Erik Garin at Rec.Sport.Soccer Statistics Foundation
