= 1936–37 FC Basel season =

FC Basel
1936–37 season
- Chairman: Emil Junker
- First team coach / Player-manager: Heinz Körner from mid-season Fernand Jaccard
- Ground: Landhof, Basel
- Nationalliga: 11th
- Swiss Cup: 1st round
- Top goalscorer: League: Guglielmo Spadini (10); All: Guglielmo Spadini (10)
- Highest home attendance: 6,000 on 26 January 1937 vs Nordstern Basel
- Lowest home attendance: 2,000 on 17 September 1936 vs Lugano and on 14 February 1937 vs St. Gallen and on 30 May 1937 vs Lausanne-Sport
- Average home league attendance: 3,250

The FC Basel 1936–37 season was the forty-fourth season since the club's foundation on 15 November 1893. FC Basel played their home games in the Landhof in the district Wettstein in Kleinbasel. Emil Junker was the new club chairman and it was his second period as chairman, after his short period in 1927. Junker toll over as club president from Franz Rinderer.

== Overview ==
Heinz Körner was appointed as new team manager. He followed Alwin Riemke who moved to Germany to manage SpVgg Greuther Fürth. Körner had been manager of Aarau the previous season. He was the tenth professional team manager/trainer in Basel's history, their tenth foreign trainer. How long Körner stayed with the club is not clearly stated, but he left during the season, and afterwards Fernand Jaccard took over as player-manager. Jaccard was the club's first professional Swiss trainer. Basel played a total of 40 matches in their 1936–37 season. 26 of these matches were in the Nationalliga, one in the Swiss Cup and 13 were friendly matches. Of these 13 friendlies eight were played at home in the Landhof, three others in Switzerland and one each as visitors to RC Strasbourg and to SC Freiburg.

Further league reforms took place before the season started. The number of teams in the 1936–37 Nationalliga was reduced by one team, thus contested by 13 teams and played as round-robin. Two teams were to be relegated and only one promoted to reduce the number of teams to 12 the following year. Basel played a very poor and un-consistent season. Only thanks to four consecutive victories towards the end of the campaign lifted the team to finish in joint second last position in the league table. Because La Chaux-de-Fonds and Basel both had 20 points, they had to have a play-off against relegation. This ended in a draw and so a replay was required. The replay was played in the Stadion Neufeld in Bern on 20 June 1937 and ended in a 1–0 victory for Basel and so they prevented relegation at the last possible moment.

In the 1st principal round of the Swiss Cup Basel were drawn at home in the Landhof against lower tier Concordia Basel and were defeated and knocked out of the competition. Grasshopper Club won both championship and cup.

== Players ==
The following is the list of the Basel first team squad during the season 1936–37. The list includes players that were in the squad the day the season started on 2 August 1936 but subsequently left the club after that date.

Note: Flags indicate national team as defined under FIFA eligibility rules; some limited exceptions apply. Players may hold more than one non-FIFA nationality.

No.	Pos.	Nation	Player
—	GK	SUI	Eugène de Kalbermatten
—	GK	SUI	Ernst Kipfer
—	DF	SUI	Robert Büchi
—	DF	SUI	Louis Favre
—	MF	SUI	Ernst Hufschmid
—	DF	GER	Emil Hummel
—	DF	SUI	Heinrich Diethelm
—	DF	SUI	Heinz Elsässer
—	MF	SUI	August Ibach
—	MF	SUI	Fernand Jaccard
—	MF	SUI	Caspar Monigatti

No.	Pos.	Nation	Player
—	MF	SUI	Paul Schaub
—	MF	SUI	Fritz Schmidlin (I)
—	MF	SUI	Guglielmo Spadini
—	MF	SUI	Ferdinand Spichiger
—	MF	SUI	Eduard Zuber
—	FW	SUI	Enrico Ardizzoia
—	FW	AUT	Josef Artimovicz
—	FW	SUI	Maurice Dubosson
—	FW	AUT	Gottfried Havlicek
—	FW	SUI	Othmar Saner
—	FW	SUI	H. Weber (I)
—	FW	SUI	Alfons Weber (II)

Players who left the squad

Note: Flags indicate national team as defined under FIFA eligibility rules; some limited exceptions apply. Players may hold more than one non-FIFA nationality.

No.	Pos.	Nation	Player
—	GK	SUI	Hugo Burkhardt
—	GK	FRG	Alwin Riemke
—	MF	SUI	Hans Greiner
—	MF	SUI	Walter Schmidlin (II)
—	MF	AUT	Ludwig Stroh

No.	Pos.	Nation	Player
—	FW	SUI	Karl Bielser
—	FW	SUI	Alfred Jaeck
—	FW	SUI	Walter Müller
—	FW	SUI	Alfred Schlecht
—	FW	SUI	Federico Schott

== Results ==
=== Legend ===
Win Draw Loss Postponed

=== Friendly matches ===
==== Pre-season ====
2 August 1936 Pre-season	RC Strasbourg (France)	1–2	(Switzerland) Basel	Strasbourg
	Goal	Summary	Goal

8 August 1936 Pre-season	Basel (Switzerland)	3–5	(Switzerland) Grasshopper Club	Landhof, Basel
17:30	Weber (2x); Artimovicz (1x)	Summary	(4x) Xam (1x) Wagner	Attendance: 1,500; Referee: (Switzerland) G. Rupprecht Basel

23 August 1936 Pre-season	Basel (Switzerland)	3–4	(West Germany) Karlsruher FV	Landhof, Basel
16:00	Jaccard (1x); Weber (1x); Dubosson (1x)	Summary	(2x) Rapp (2x) Damminger	Attendance: 1,000; Referee: (Switzerland) Karl Wunderlin Basel

25 August 1936 Pre-season	Basel (Switzerland)	1–1	(Austria) First Vienna FC	Landhof, Basel
18:15	Artimovicz (1:1)	Summary	(0:1) Holec	Attendance: 1,000; Referee: (Switzerland) Karl Wunderlin Basel

==== Mid-season ====
25 October 1936 Mid-season	Lausanne-Sport (Switzerland)	3–4	(Switzerland) Basel	Olympique de la Pontaise, Lausanne
15:00	Jäggi 30' (1:0); Kotzeff (2:2); Stelzer 87' (3:3)	Summary	(1:1) Dubosson; 60' (1:2) Schmidlin (I) (2:3) Ibach (3:4) Ibach	Attendance: 1,200; Referee: (Switzerland) Lutz Geneva

1 November 1936 Mid-season	Basel (Switzerland)	1–5	(Switzerland) Nordstern Basel	Landhof, Basel
10:15	Ibach 16' (1:0)	Summary	26' (1:1) Forelli; 65' (1:2) Brückler; 70' (1:3) Forelli; 75' (1:4) Brückler; 80' (pen. 1:5) Laube	Attendance: 1,000; Referee: (Switzerland) Traub Basel

8 November 1936 Mid-season	Basel (Switzerland)	3–2	(Croatia) Građanski Zagreb	Landhof, Basel
15:00	Schmidlin (I) 1' (1:0); Weber 46' (2:1); Hufschmid 51' (3:1)	Summary	(1:1) (3:2)	Attendance: 2,000; Referee: (Switzerland) Karl Wunderlin Basel

20 December 1936 Mid-season	Basel (Switzerland)	2–4	(Hungary) Ferencvárosi TC	Landhof, Basel
14:45	Havlicek 12' (1:0); Weber 29' (2:0)	Summary	30' (2:1) Jazberenyi; 62' (2:2) Jazberenyi; 72' (2:3) Toldi; 83' (2:4) Kemény	Attendance: 4,000; Referee: (Switzerland) Feurer Delémont

21 February 1937 Mid-season	FC Olten (Switzerland)	0–2	(Switzerland) Basel	Kleinholz Stadion, Olten
		Summary	(0:1) Saner (0:2) Jaccard	Attendance: 200; Referee: (Switzerland) Beer

6 March 1937 Mid-season	Basel (Switzerland)	15–2	(Switzerland) FC Breite	Landhof, Basel
	Goal	Summary	Goal

14 March 1937 Mid-season	SC Freiburg (West Germany)	3–1	(Switzerland) Basel	Freiburg im Breisgau
	36' (1:1); Roser 58' (2:1); Haas 70' (3:1)	Summary	(penalty missed) 12′ Elsässer; 22' (0:1) Saner	Attendance: 800; Referee: (West Germany) Buchty

11 April 1937 Mid-season	Basel (Switzerland)	0–1	(Switzerland) Young Boys	Landhof, Basel
10:30		Summary	75' (0:1) Sydler	Attendance: 1,000; Referee: (Switzerland) Meury

18 April 1937 Mid-season	Cantonal Neuchatel (Switzerland)	2–2	(Switzerland) Basel	Stade de la Maladière (1924), Neuchâtel
15:00	Castella Castella 35' (1:1); Monnard (II) (2:2)	Summary	5' (0:1) Ibach (1:2) Ibach	Attendance: 700; Referee: (Switzerland) Gerber Bern

=== Nationalliga ===
==== League matches ====
30 August 1936 Round 1	FC Bern	1–0	Basel	Neufeld, Bern
	Wagenhoffer 40' (1:0)	Summary		Attendance: 2,500; Referee: (Switzerland) Meyer LausanneL

6 September 1936 Round 2	Basel	0–5	Biel-Bienne	Landhof, Basel
15:00		Summary	12' (1:0) Büche; 14' (0:2) Büche (0:3) Schicker; 56' (0:4) Büche (0:5) Büche	Attendance: 2,500; Referee: (Switzerland) Jaggi Bern

13 September 1936 Round 3	Nordstern Basel	1–3	Basel	Stadion Rankhof, Basel
09:30	Maurer 16' (1:0)	Summary	21' (o.g. 1:1) Kaltenbrunner; 27' (1:2) Büchi; 72' (1:3) Hufschmid	Attendance: 2,500; Referee: (Switzerland) Hans Wüthrich Bern

27 September 1936 Round 4	Basel	3–3	Lugano	Landhof, Basel
15:00	Spadini 15' (1:0); Spadini 25' (2:1); Spadini 26' (3:1)	Summary	17' (1:1) Stefanovic (3:2) Stefanovic (3:3) Schott	Attendance: 2,000; Referee: (Switzerland) Spengler Olten

11 October 1936 Round 5	St. Gallen	2–1	Basel	Espenmoos, St. Gallen
	Krismer 18' (1:0) (o.g. 2:1)	Summary	24' (1:1) Spadini	Attendance: 1,000; Referee: (Switzerland) Jaggi Bern

18 October 1936 Round 6	Basel	2–1	Servette	Landhof, Basel
15:00	Hummel 60' (1:0); Spadini 80' (2:1)	Summary	(pen. 1:1) Walaschek	Attendance: 3,000; Referee: (Switzerland) Hans Wüthrich Bern

15 November 1936 Round 7	Young Fellows Zürich	1–0	Basel	Letzigrund, Zürich
	Tögel (1:0)	Summary		Attendance: 2,000; Referee: (Switzerland) W. Bangerter La Chaux-de-Fonds

22 November 1936 Round 8	Basel	0–2	Young Boys	Landhof, Basel
14:30		Summary	52' (0:1) Sydler; 67' (0:2) Sipos	Attendance: 4,000; Referee: (Switzerland) Meyer Lausanne

29 September 1936 Round 9	La Chaux-de-Fonds	0–0	Basel	Stade Charrière, La Chaux-de-Fonds
14:30		Summary		Attendance: 3,200; Referee: (Switzerland) Dupuis Yverdon

13 December 1936 Round 10	Luzern	2–1	Basel	Stadion Allmend, Luzern
	Docze (1:0); Gloor (2:0)	Summary	85' (2:1) Ibach	Attendance: 2,500; Referee: (Switzerland) Allemann Biel/Bienne

2 December 1936 Round 12	Lausanne-Sport	3–0	Basel	Olympique de la Pontaise, Lausanne
14:30	Jäggi 43' (pen. 1:0); Jäggi (2:0); Spagnoli (3:0)	Summary		Attendance: 2,500; Referee: (Switzerland) W. Bangerter La Chaux-de-Fonds

3 January 1937 Round 13	Basel	2–0	Grasshopper Club	Landhof, Basel
14:30	Elsässer 43' (pen. 1:0); Ibach 70' (2:0)	Summary		Attendance: 2,500; Referee: (Switzerland) Dupuis Yverdon

10 January 1937 Round 14	Basel	2–2	FC Bern	Landhof, Basel
14:30	Ibach 2' (1:0); Hufschmid (2:1)	Summary	30' (1:1) Wagenhofer; 88' (2:2) Billeter	Attendance: 4,000; Referee: (Switzerland) Meyer Lausanne

17 January 1937 Round 15	Biel-Bienne	2–0	Basel	Gurzelen Stadion, Biel/Bienne
	Chiesi 30' (1:0); Rahmen 60' (2:0)	Summary		Attendance: 2,000; Referee: (Switzerland) Spengler Olten

24 January 1937 Round 16	Basel	1–1	Nordstern Basel	Landhof, Basel
14:30	Spadini 48' (1:1)	Summary	27' (0:1) Forelli	Attendance: 6,000; Referee: (Switzerland) Hans Wüthrich Bern

31 January 1937 Round 17	Lugano	2–1	Basel	Campo Marzio, Lugano
	Stefanovic 5' (1:0); Grassi 51' (2:0)	Summary	(2:1) Spadini	Attendance: 1,500; Referee: (Switzerland) Iseli Biel/Bienne

14 February 1937 Round 18	Basel	1–0	St. Gallen	Landhof, Basel
14:30	Elsässer 45' (pen. 1:0)	Summary		Attendance: 2,000; Referee: (Switzerland) Hans Wüthrich Bern

28 February 1937 Round 19	Servette	3–1	Basel	Charmilles Stadium, Geneva
	Belli 19' (1:0); Gross 49' (2:1); Gross 74' (3:1)	Summary	21' (1:1) Saner	Attendance: 1,500; Referee: (Switzerland) Spengler Olten

Round 20	Basel	–	Young Fellows Zürich	Landhof, Basel
		[ Summary]

4 April 1937 Round 21	Young Boys	1–2	Basel	Wankdorf Stadium, Bern
	Aebi 10' (1:0)	Summary	(1:1) Saner; 59' (1:2) Spadini	Attendance: 3,000; Referee: (Switzerland) Dupuis Yverdon

25 April 1937 Round 22	Basel	3–2	La Chaux-de-Fonds	Landhof, Basel
15:00	Weber 14' (1:0); Weber 40' (2:0); Saner 63' (3:1)	Summary	52' (pen. 2:1) Schaller; 78' (3:2) Lukacs	Attendance: 3,500; Referee: (Switzerland) Hans Wüthrich Bern

9 May 1937 Round 23	Basel	5–1	Luzern	Landhof, Basel
15:00	Schmidlin (I) (1:0); Ibach (2:0); Spadini (3:0); Saner 63' (4:1) (o.g. 5:1)	Summary	22' (3:1) Karcher	Attendance: 3,500; Referee: (Switzerland) Spengler Olten

13 May 1937 Round 20	Basel	2–1	Young Fellows Zürich	Landhof, Basel
18:20	Weber 6' (1:0); Jaccard 25' (2:0)	Summary	43' (2:1) Pali	Attendance: 3,000; Referee: (Switzerland) Dupuis Yverdon

30 May 1937 Round 25	Basel	0–2	Lausanne-Sport	Landhof, Basel
15:00		Summary	66' (0:1) Spagnoli; 73' (0:2) Becic	Attendance: 2,000; Referee: (Switzerland) Allemann Biel/Bienne

6 June 1937 Round 26	Grasshopper Club	4–0	Basel	Hardturm, Zürich
17:00	Fauguel 23' (1:0); Rupf 31' (2:0); Xam 53' (3:0); Rupf 73' (4:0)	Summary		Attendance: 2,500; Referee: (Switzerland) Hans Wüthrich Bern

==== Play-off against relegation ====
13 June 1937 Play-off	Basel	1–1 (a.e.t.)	La Chaux-de-Fonds	Wankdorf Stadium, Bern
	Weber (1:1)	Summary	97' (0:1) Bösch	Attendance: 2,500; Referee: (Switzerland) Spengler Olten

20 June 1937 Replay	Basel	1–0 (a.e.t.)	La Chaux-de-Fonds	Neufeld, Bern
17:30	Spadini 32' (1:0)	Summary		Attendance: 4,000; Referee: (Switzerland) Hans Wüthrich Bern

==== League table ====
Pos	Team	Pld	W	D	L	GF	GA	GD	Pts	Qualification
1	Grasshopper Club	24	15	6	3	68	32	+36	36	Swiss Champions and Cup winners
2	Young Boys	24	12	5	7	61	36	+25	29	
3	Young Fellows Zürich	24	12	4	8	57	53	+4	28	
4	Luzern	24	11	6	7	44	45	−1	28	
5	Biel-Bienne	24	11	5	8	45	37	+8	27	
6	Lugano	24	11	4	9	57	54	+3	26	
7	Servette	24	11	3	10	55	47	+8	25	
8	Lausanne-Sport	24	10	3	11	56	40	+16	23	
9	FC Bern	24	8	6	10	42	44	−2	22	
10	Nordstern Basel	24	7	7	10	42	50	−8	21	
11	Basel	24	8	4	12	30	42	−12	20	Play-off winner, remain in Nationalliga
12	La Chaux-de-Fonds	24	9	2	13	54	61	−7	20	Play-off loser, relegated
13	St. Gallen	24	2	3	19	32	102	−70	7	Relegated

Source: rsssf.com

=== Swiss Cup ===
4 October 1936 Round 1	Basel	1–3	Concordia Basel	Landhof, Basel
15:00	Hummel 14' (1:0)	Summary	25' (1:1) Kult; 75' (1:2) Vonthron; 81' (1:3) Schill	Attendance: 3,500; Referee: (Switzerland) Spengler Olten

== See also ==
- History of FC Basel
- List of FC Basel players
- List of FC Basel seasons

== Sources ==
- Rotblau: Jahrbuch Saison 2014/2015. Publisher: FC Basel Marketing AG. ISBN 978-3-7245-2027-6
- Die ersten 125 Jahre. Publisher: Josef Zindel im Friedrich Reinhardt Verlag, Basel. ISBN 978-3-7245-2305-5
- FCB team 1936/37 at fcb-archiv.ch
- Switzerland 1936/37 by Erik Garin at Rec.Sport.Soccer Statistics Foundation
