= 1935–36 FC Basel season =

FC Basel
1935–36 season
- Chairman: Franz Rinderer
- First team coach: Alwin Riemke
- Ground: Landhof, Basel
- Nationalliga: 10th
- Swiss Cup: 1st round
- Top goalscorer: League: Josef Artimovicz (14); All: Josef Artimovicz (14)
- Highest home attendance: 4,000 on 22 March 1936 vs Nordstern Basel
- Lowest home attendance: 1,500 on 19 January 1936br />vs Aarau
- Average home league attendance: 2,730

The FC Basel 1935–36 season was the forty-third season since the club's foundation on 15 November 1893. FC Basel played their home games in the Landhof in the district Wettstein in Kleinbasel. Franz Rinderer was again voted as the club chairman and this was his fifth consecutive season as club president.

== Overview ==
Alwin Riemke was appointed as new team manager. He followed Richard (Dombi) Kohn who had moved on to manage Feyenoord. Riemke came from Lausanne-Sport, who had won the double in the previous Nationalliga championship season and the Cup. Riemke acted as player-manager and played four matches during the season. Basel played a total of 38 matches in their 1935–36 season. 26 of these matches were in the Nationalliga, one in the Swiss Cup and 11 were friendly matches. Of these 11 friendlies six were played at home and the others all in Switzerland. Interesting visitors to the Landhof were the French teams Mulhouse, Excelsior AC Roubaix and Olympique Lillois, the Hungarian teams MTK Budapest and Budapest Honvéd and the Austrian team Wiener AC. Of theses 11 friendly matches seven ended with a victory, one was drawn and three ended in a defeat.

The 1935–36 Nationalliga was contested by 14 teams and was played in a double round robin. Basel played a very mediocre season and ended the championship in 10th position. They won just eight of their 26 games and with 20 points ended the season 21 points behind Lausanne-Sport who won the championship for the second consecutive season. Josef Artimovicz was Basel's top scorer with 14 goals, Jaeck second best scorer with 9 goals.

In the 1st principal round of the Swiss Cup Basel were drawn at home in the Landhof against lower tier Luzern. But they were defeated and thus knocked out. Young Fellows Zürich won the cup.

== Players ==
The following is the list of the Basel first team squad during the season 1935–36. The list includes players that were in the squad the day the season started on 3 August 1935 but subsequently left the club after that date.

Note: Flags indicate national team as defined under FIFA eligibility rules; some limited exceptions apply. Players may hold more than one non-FIFA nationality.

No.	Pos.	Nation	Player
—	GK	SUI	Hugo Burkhardt
—	GK	SUI	Eugène de Kalbermatten
—	GK	FRG	Alwin Riemke
—	DF	SUI	Robert Büchi
—	MF	SUI	Ernst Hufschmid
—	DF	GER	Emil Hummel
—	DF	SUI	Heinrich Diethelm
—	DF	SUI	Heinz Elsässer
—	MF	SUI	Hans Greiner
—	MF	SUI	August Ibach
—	MF	SUI	Fernand Jaccard
—	MF	SUI	Caspar Monigatti
—	MF	SUI	Paul Schaub

No.	Pos.	Nation	Player
—	MF	SUI	Fritz Schmidlin (I)
—	MF	SUI	Walter Schmidlin (I)
—	MF	SUI	Guglielmo Spadini
—	MF	SUI	Ferdinand Spichiger
—	MF	AUT	Ludwig Stroh
—	MF	SUI	Eduard Zuber
—	FW	SUI	Enrico Ardizzoia
—	FW	AUT	Josef Artimovicz
—	FW	SUI	Karl Bielser
—	FW	SUI	Alfred Jaeck
—	FW	SUI	Walter Müller
—	FW	SUI	? Noll
—	FW	SUI	Alfred Schlecht
—	FW	SUI	Federico Schott

Players who left the squad

Note: Flags indicate national team as defined under FIFA eligibility rules; some limited exceptions apply. Players may hold more than one non-FIFA nationality.

No.	Pos.	Nation	Player
—	GK	SUI	Willy Hufschmid
—	GK	SUI	Kurt Imhof

No.	Pos.	Nation	Player
—	DF	GER	Hermann Enderlin (II)
—	FW	AUT	Otto Haftl

== Results ==
=== Legend ===
Win Draw Loss Postponed

=== Friendly matches ===
==== Pre-season ====
3 August 1935 Pre-season	FC Birsfelden (Switzerland)	1–3	(Switzerland) Basel	Sportplatz Birsfelden
	Gass (1:3)	Summary	16' (0:1) Artimovicz; 55' (0:2) Diethelm; 57' (1:2) Casola	Attendance: 800; Referee: (Switzerland) Karl Wunderlin Basel

11 August 1935 Pre-season	Vevey-Sports (Switzerland)	2–7	(Switzerland) Basel	Vevey
	Goal	[ Summary]	Goal

17 August 1935 Pre-season	Basel (Switzerland)	5–2	(France) Mulhouse	Landhof, Basel
17:00	Schott (2x); Diethelm (1x); Hufschmid (1x); Artimovicz (1x)	Summary	(1x) Grünfeld (1x) Flegel	Attendance: 2,000; Referee: (Switzerland) Ketterer Basel

==== Mid-season ====
3 November 1935 Mid-season	Solothurn (Switzerland)	2–1	(Switzerland) Basel	Solothurn
	Jäggi (III) (1x); Wolf (1x)	Summary	Goal

10 November 1935 Mid-season	Basel (Switzerland)	2–3	(France) Excelsior AC Roubaix	Landhof, Basel
	Zuber 81' (1:3); Zuber 88' (pen, 2:3)	Summary	32' (0:1) Fructuoso; 65' (0:2) Hiltl; 80' (0:3) Schweiger	Attendance: 1,800; Referee: (Switzerland) Jost Basel

1 December 1935 Mid-season	Basel (Switzerland)	2–1	(Austria) Wiener AC	Stadion Rankhof, Basel
	Jaeck 10' (1:1); Brückler 80' (2:1)	Summary	7' (0:1) Nytsch	Attendance: 1,000; Referee: (Switzerland) Speidel Basel

26 December 1935 Mid-season	Basel (Switzerland)	2–6	(Hungary) MTK Budapest	Landhof, Basel
14:00	Müller 75' (1:3); Hufschmid (0:6)	Summary	11' (0:1) Titkos; 16' (0:2) Titkos (0:3) Titkos; 59' (0:4) Cseh; 68' (0:5) Kardos (0:6) Laube	Attendance: 2,500; Referee: (Switzerland) Karl Wunderlin Basel

4 April 1936 Mid-season	Basel (Switzerland)	3–3	(Hungary) Budapest Honvéd	Landhof, Basel
16:30	Artimovicz 53' (1:1); Mohler 56' (2:1); Mohler 60' (3:1)	Summary	4' (0:1) Szabo (II); 67' (3:2) Ujvari; 90' (3:3) Nemes	Attendance: 2.000; Referee: (Switzerland) Speidel Basel

13 April 1935 Mid-season	Montreux-Sports (Switzerland)	1–4	(Switzerland) Basel	Montreux
	Goal	Summary	Goal

21 May 1935 Mid-season	Basel (Switzerland)	3–1	(France) Olympique Lillois	Landhof, Basel
15:00	Artimovicz 15' (1:0); Artimovicz (red card) 63'; Laube 63' (pen. 2:1); Frey 72' (3:1)	Summary	(1:1) Higgins	Attendance: 1,500; Referee: (Switzerland) Müry Basel

30 May 1936 Mid-season	Basel (Switzerland)	3–2	(Netherlands) Zwaluwen	Landhof, Basel
17:00	Brückler 5' (1:1); Artimovicz 75' (pen. 2:2); Artimovicz 80' (3:2)	Summary	4' (0:1) Lagendaal; 58' (1:2) Lagendaal	Attendance: 1,500; Referee: (Switzerland) Karl Wunderlin Basel

=== Nationalliga ===
==== League matches ====
25 August 1935 Round 1	St. Gallen	3–2	Basel	Espenmoos, St. Gallen
	Hollenstein 53' (1:2); Krismer 55' (2:2); Hollenstein 65' (3:2)	Summary	(0:1) Artimovicz; 42' (0:2) Schott	Attendance: 2,500; Referee: (Switzerland) Hans Wüthrich Bern

1 September 1935 Round 2	Aarau	2–4	Basel	Stadion Brügglifeld, Aarau
	Lienhard (1:4); Lienhard (2:4)	Summary	(0:1) Hummel (0:2) Hummel (0:3) Hummel (0:4) Artimovicz	Attendance: 1,200; Referee: (Switzerland) Corrodi Bern

7 September 1935 Round 3	Basel	2–1	Grasshopper Club	Landhof, Basel
17:00	Spadini 60' (1:1); Schott 75' (2:1)	Summary	20' (0:1) Fauguel	Attendance: 3,000; Referee: (Switzerland) Meyer Lausanne

22 September 1935 Round 4	Locarno	4–3	Basel	Stadio del Lido, Locarno
	Cavalli 30' (1:1); Signorin (2:2); Pinter (3:3); Pinter (4:3)	Summary	10' (0:1) Artimovicz (1:2) Hufschmid (2:3) Jaeck	Attendance: 800; Referee: (Switzerland) Allemann Biel/Bienne

29 September 1935 Round 5	Basel	6–0	La Chaux-de-Fonds	Landhof, Basel
15:00	Artimovicz (3x); Jaeck (2x); Spadini (1x)	Summary		Attendance: 3,000; Referee: (Switzerland) Iseli Biel/Bienne

13 October 1935 Round 6	FC Bern	4–2	Basel	Neufeld, Bern
	Bösch (2x) (2x) Kielholz	Summary	(1x) Jaeck (1x) Schott	Attendance: 3,500; Referee: (Switzerland) W. Bangerter La Chaux-de-Fonds

17 November 1935 Round 7	Lausanne-Sport	6–0	Basel	Olympique de la Pontaise, Lausanne
	Spagnoli 7' (1:0); Stelzer (2:0); Rochat (3:0); Spagnoli (4:0); Spagnoli (5:0); Hochsträsser (6:0)	Summary		Attendance: 3,000; Referee: (Switzerland) Iseli Biel/Bienne

Round 8	Nordstern Basel	–	Basel	Stadion Rankhof, Basel
		[ Summary]

24 November 1935 Round 9	Basel	2–3	Young Fellows Zürich	Landhof, Basel
	Schott (1:3); Jaeck (pen. 2:3)	Summary	10' (1:0) Frigerio; 50' (pen. 2:0) Frigerio; 68' (3:0) Frigerio	Attendance: 2,500; Referee: (Switzerland) Spengler Olten

8 December 1935 Round 10	Lugano	1–1	Basel	Cornaredo, Lugano
	Soldini 10' (1:0)	Summary	20' (1:1) Artimovicz	Attendance: 3,000; Referee: (Switzerland) Spengler Olten

15 December 1935 Round 11	Basel	2–0	Biel-Bienne	Landhof, Basel
14:30	Hufschmid 2' (1:0); Hufschmid 79' (2:0)	Summary		Attendance: 3,000; Referee: (Switzerland) Hans Wüthrich Bern

22 December 1935 Round 12	Young Boys	1–0	Basel	Wankdorf Stadium, Bern
	Stegmeier (1:0)	Summary		Attendance: 2,500; Referee: (Switzerland) Spengler Olten

29 December 1935 Round 13	Basel	1–0	Servette	Landhof, Basel
14:30	Schaub 44' (1:0)	Summary		Attendance: 3,000; Referee: (Switzerland) Iseli Biel/Bienne

5 January 1936 Round 8	Nordstern Basel	0–0	Basel	Stadion Rankhof, Basel
14:30		Summary		Attendance: 6,000; Referee: (Switzerland) W. Bangerter La Chaux-de-Fonds

12 January 1936 Round 14	Basel	2–3	St. Gallen	Landhof, Basel
	Artimovicz 55' (1:1); Diethelm 60' (2:1)	Summary	30' (0:1) Valentinuzzi; 64' (2:2) Krismer (2:3) Kreis	Attendance: 2,500; Referee: (Switzerland) Heer Bern

19 January 1936 Round 15	Basel	2–0	Aarau	Landhof, Basel
14:30	Diethelm 78' (1:0); Schaub 83' (2:0)	Summary		Attendance: 1,500; Referee: (Switzerland) Jaggi Bern

26 January 1936 Round 16	Grasshopper Club	5–2	Basel	Hardturm, Zürich
14:30	Xam 6' (1:0); Xam 19' (2:0); Rauch 34' (3:0); Bickel (4:0); Bickel 70' (5:1)	Summary	68' (4:1) Schmidlin (I) (5:2) Schmidlin (I)	Attendance: 2,500; Referee: (Switzerland) Iseli Biel/Bienne

9 February 1936 Round 17	Basel	6–0	Locarno	Landhof, Basel
14:30	Spadini 14' (1:0); Jaeck 62' (2:0); Artimovicz 68' (3:0); Jaeck 70' (4:0); Artimovicz 72' (5:0); Jaeck 89' (6:0)	Summary		Attendance: 2,500; Referee: (Switzerland) W. Bangerter La Chaux-de-Fonds

16 February 1936 Round 18	La Chaux-de-Fonds	1–0	Basel	Stade Charrière, La Chaux-de-Fonds
14:30	Schaller 83' (1:0)	Summary		Attendance: 3,000; Referee: (Switzerland) Jaggi Bern

23 February 1936 Round 19	Basel	1–5	FC Bern	Landhof, Basel
14:30	Artimovicz 75' (1:5)	Summary	13' (0:1) Cavalli; 30' (0:2) Weber (0:3) Bösch; 51' (0:4) Weber; 60' (0:5) Weber	Attendance: 2,000; Referee: (Switzerland) Allemann Biel/Bienne

29 February 1936 Round 20	Basel	0–3	Lausanne-Sport	Landhof, Basel
16:00		Summary	30' (pen. 0:1) Jäggi; 54' (0:2) Spagnoli; 88' (pen. 0:3) Jäggi	Attendance: 3,500; Referee: (Switzerland) Hans Wüthrich Bern

22 March 1936 Round 21	Basel	4–1	Nordstern Basel	Landhof, Basel
15:00	Schaub 10' (1:0); Artimovicz (2:0); Artimovicz (pen. 3:0); Spadini (4:1)	Summary	(3:1) Mohler	Attendance: 4,000; Referee: (Switzerland) W. Bangerter La Chaux-de-Fonds

29 March 1936 Round 22	Young Fellows Zürich	4–2	Basel	Förrlibuck, Zürich
15:00	Tögel 11' (1:0); Frigerio 54' (2:1); Frigerio 67' (3:1); Tögel 71' (4:1)	Summary	(1:1) Hufschmid (4:2) Jaccard	Attendance: 3,500; Referee: (Switzerland) Meyer Lausanne

19 April 1936 Round 23	Basel	2–3	Lugano	Landhof, Basel
14:45	Hufschmid 3' (1:0); Spadini (2:1)	Summary	58' (1:1) Poretti; 66' (2:2) Rizzo (2:3) Andreoli	Attendance: 2,500; Referee: (Switzerland) Hans Wüthrich Bern

26 April 1936 Round 24	Biel-Bienne	6–2	Basel	Gurzelen Stadion, Biel/Bienne
	Bueche 8' (1:1); Bueche (pen. 2:1); Gross 51' (3:1); Ciseri 65' (4:1); Gross 80' (5:2); Gross 81' (6:2)	Summary	4' (0:1) Hummel (4:2) Spadini	Attendance: 1,500; Referee: (Switzerland) Spengler Olten

10 May 1936 Round 25	Basel	1–1	Young Boys	Landhof, Basel
15:00	Jaeck (1:0)	Summary	85' (1:1) Petrak	Attendance: 2,500; Referee: (Switzerland) Allemann Biel/Bienne

17 May 1936 Round 26	Servette	2–2	Basel	Charmilles Stadium, Geneva
15:00	Nyvlt (1:2); Loichot 90' (2:2)	Summary	16' (0:1) Ibach (pen. 0:2) Artimovicz	Attendance: 1,800; Referee: (Switzerland) Gerber Bern

==== League table ====
Pos	Team	Pld	W	D	L	GF	GA	GD	Pts	Qualification
1	Lausanne Sports	26	17	7	2	75	23	+52	41	Swiss Champions
2	Young Fellows Zürich	26	16	6	4	62	34	+28	38	Swiss Cup winners
3	Grasshopper Club Zürich	26	15	6	5	64	25	+39	36	
4	FC Bern	26	15	4	7	71	49	+22	34	
5	FC Biel-Bienne	26	12	4	10	60	46	+14	28	
6	BSC Young Boys	26	10	6	10	38	40	−2	26	
7	Servette FC Genève	26	8	8	10	37	46	−9	24	
8	FC Lugano	26	7	9	10	38	47	−9	23	
9	FC St. Gallen	26	9	5	12	36	52	−16	23	
10	FC Basel	26	8	4	14	51	59	−8	20	
11	FC Nordstern Basel	26	8	4	14	41	60	−19	20	
12	FC La Chaux-de-Fonds	26	6	6	14	47	69	−22	18	
13	FC Locarno	26	7	3	16	35	62	−27	17	Relegated
14	FC Aarau	26	5	6	15	47	90	−43	16	Relegated

Source: rsssf.com

=== Swiss Cup ===
6 October 1935 Round 1	Basel	0–2	Luzern	Landhof, Basel
15:00		Summary	(0:1) Haiszau (0:2) Brönnimann	Attendance: 3,500; Referee: (Switzerland) Alfred Spengler (Olten)
Note: Luzern played the 1935/36 season in the 1. Liga (second tier), at the end of the season they won the 1. Liga championship and achieved promotion.

== See also ==
- History of FC Basel
- List of FC Basel players
- List of FC Basel seasons

== Sources ==
- Rotblau: Jahrbuch Saison 2014/2015. Publisher: FC Basel Marketing AG. ISBN 978-3-7245-2027-6
- Die ersten 125 Jahre. Publisher: Josef Zindel im Friedrich Reinhardt Verlag, Basel. ISBN 978-3-7245-2305-5
- FCB team 1935/36 at fcb-archiv.ch
- Switzerland 1935/36 by Erik Garin at Rec.Sport.Soccer Statistics Foundation
