= 1937–38 Swiss Cup =

Tournament details
- Country: Switzerland

Final positions
- Champions: Grasshopper Club
- Runners-up: Servette

The 1937–38 Swiss Cup was the 13th edition of Switzerland's football cup competition, organised annually since the 1925–26 season by the Swiss Football Association.

== Overview ==
This season's cup competition began with a three preliminary rounds which were played during the last two week-ends of August and the first week-end in September. The first principal round was played at the beginning of October. The competition was to be completed on Easter Monday, 18 April 1938, with the final, which since a few years, was held in the country's capital in Bern, at the former Wankdorf Stadium.

The preliminary rounds were held for the lower league teams that were not qualified for the main rounds. The 24 clubs from this season's 1. Liga and the 12 clubs from the 1937–38 Nationalliga joined the competition in the first principal round which was played Sunday 3 October.

The matches were played in a knockout format. In the event of a draw after 90 minutes, the match went into extra time. In the event of a draw at the end of extra time, if agreed between the clubs, a replay was foreseen and this was played on the visiting team's pitch. If the replay ended in a draw after extra time, or if a replay had not been agreed, a toss of a coin would establish the team that qualified for the next round.

== Preliminary rounds ==
The lower league teams that were not directly qualified for the competition competed here in three preliminary rounds. Reserve teams were not admitted to the competition. The aim of this preliminary stage was to reduce the number of teams to 28 for the first main round. The draw respected local regionalities. The preliminary rounds was played at the end of August in advance of the lower leagues season.

=== First preliminary round ===
| Team 1 | Score | Team 2 |
|---|---|---|
22 August 1937
| US Bienne-Boujean | 4–2 (a.e.t.) | FC Madretsch (Biel) |
| FC Gränichen | 3–2 | FC Luterbach |
| SV Seebach (ZH) | 6–1 | FC Phönix (Winterthur) |
| FC Floria Olympic (La Chaux-de-Fonds) | 3–8 | FC Gloria (Le Locle) |
| FC La Neuveville | 4–4 (a.e.t.) | FC Fleurier |

Replay

| Team 1 | Score | Team 2 |
|---|---|---|
29 August 1937
| FC Fleurier | 5–2 | FC La Neuveville |

=== Second preliminary round ===
| Team 1 | Score | Team 2 |
|---|---|---|
22 August 1937
| Bulle | 1–4 | Central Friboug |
29 August 1937
| FC Cointrin | 1–3 | FC Renens |
| CS La Tour-de-Peilz | 2–6 | Stade Lausanne |
| Racing Club Lausanne | 2–0 | ES Malley |
| FC Sierre | 3–0 | Martigny-Sports |
| FC Tramelan | 4–0 | Sylva Le Locle |
| FC Xamax (Neuchâtel) | 1–0 | Couvet-Sports |
| Espérance Genève | 1–4 | CA Genève |
| Amical Abattoir (GE) | 0–6 | USI Dopolavoro Genève |
| Vallorbe-Sports | 5–4 (a.e.t.) | FC Yverdon |
| Villeneuve-Sports | 1–5 | Sion |
| FC Saint-Imier | 2–5 | FC Gloria (Le Locle) |
| US Bienne-Boujean | 0–5 | Moutier |
| FC Tavannes | 2–4 | FC Aurore Bienne |
| FC Nidau | 2–1 | FC Grünstern (Ipsach) |
| Fribourg | 3–1 | Richemond Daillettes (FR) |
| Minerva Bern | 0–5 | Thun |
| FC Breite (Basel) | 2–1 | Helvetik Basel |
| Laufen | 1–3 | FC Allschwil |
| FC Birsfelden | 2–1 | Olympia Basel |
| FC Helvetia Bern | 3–1 | FC Viktoria Bern |
| FC Münchenstein | 6–3 | Delémont |
| FC Liestal | 1–2 | Black Stars |
| FC Flawil | 2–3 | Kreuzlingen |
| SV Seebach (ZH) | 2–4 | FC Tössfeld (Winterthur) |
| FC Töss (Winterthur) | 6–1 | FC Neuhausen |
| FC Fortuna (SG) | 0–2 | Arbon |
| FC Romanshorn | 4–2 | Rasensport St.Gallen |
| Bülach | 0–2 | FC Oerlikon (ZH) |
| FC Altstetten (Zürich) | 4–0 | SC Veltheim (Winterthur) |
| Chur | 1–0 | FC Ems |
| SC Zug | 1–0 | Luzerner Sportclub |
| Uster | 2–2 (a.e.t.) | FC Wülflingen |
5 September 1937
| FC Fleurier | 5–2 | Comète Peseux |
| Frauenfeld | 2–1 | SV Schaffhausen |
| AS Ticinese Zürich | 1–2 | FC Industrie (ZH) |
| FC Langnau | 2–4 | SC Zug |
| SV Höngg | 0–3 | FC Adliswil |
| FC Thalwil | 6–1 | FC Wetzikon |
| FC Wädenswil | 2–3 | FC Horgen |
| SC Wipkingen | 0–4 | FC Küsnacht (ZH) |
| FC Schönenwerd | 1–0 | FC Trimbach |
| Wohlen | 2–0 | FC Turgi |
| Old Boys | 2–0 | US Bottechia (BS) |
| FC Wiedikon | 2–4 | Baden |
| FC Lachen | 4–1 | FC Rapperswil |
| FC Unterentfelden | 2–2 (a.e.t.) | FC Gränichen |

Replays

| Team 1 | Score | Team 2 |
|---|---|---|
5 September 1937
| FC Wülflingen | 0–4 | Uster |
12 September 1937
| FC Gränichen | 5–3 | FC Unterentfelden |

The following matches were not played and the qualification for the next round was decided by toss of a coin.

| Team 1 | Score | Team 2 |
|---|---|---|
Toss of a coin.
| Chênois (t) | n/p | FC Gardy-Jonction |
| FC Langenthal | n/p | FC Muhen (t) |
| FC Sissach | n/p | Sportfreunde Basel (t) |
| Burgdorf | n/p | SC Zofingen (t) |
| FC Gerlafingen | n/p | FC Olten (t) |
| Köniz (t) | n/p | FC Lerchenfeld (Thun) |
| Lengnau | n/p | Fulgor Grenchen (t) |

=== Third preliminary round ===
| Team 1 | Score | Team 2 |
|---|---|---|
5 September 1937
| FC Olten | 7–0 | Sportfreunde Basel |
| Moutier | 1–3 | FC Nidau |
| FC Aurore Bienne | 1–2 (a.e.t.) | FC Bözingen |
| Fribourg | 3–1 | Köniz |
| FC Breite (Basel) | 5–1 | FC Münchenstein |
| FC Allschwil | 0–2 | Black Stars |
| FC Melide | 1–2 | GC Luganesi |
| Thun | 2–1 | FC Helvetia Bern |
| FC Tössfeld (Winterthur) | 2–1 | Arbon |
| FC Töss (Winterthur) | 5–3 | FC Romanshorn |
12 September 1937
| Chênois | 1–3 | USI Dopolavoro Genève |
| Vallorbe-Sports | 0–3 | Stade Lausanne |
| FC Sierre | 4–0 | Sion |
| Racing Club Lausanne | 2–1 | Central Friboug |
| FC Tramelan | 3–1 | FC Gloria (Le Locle) |
| FC Xamax (Neuchâtel) | 2–1 | FC Fleurier |
| FC Birsfelden | 0–1 | Old Boys |
| Zofingen | 2–1 | Fulgor Grenchen |
| FC Adliswil | 1–2 | Baden |
| SC Zug | 3–2 | FC Industrie (ZH) |
| FC Thalwil | 0–2 | Chur |
| FC Horgen | 1–5 | FC Lachen |
| FC Schönenwerd | 7–0 | FC Muhen |
| FC Küsnacht (ZH) | 0–4 | FC Oerlikon (ZH) |
| Uster | 2–3 | FC Altstetten (Zürich) |
| Kreuzlingen | 5–3 | Frauenfeld |
| FC Renens | 2–2 (a.e.t.) | CA Genève |
| Wohlen | 8–2 | FC Gränichen |

Replay

| Team 1 | Score | Team 2 |
|---|---|---|
26 September 1937
| CA Genève | 1–2 | FC Renens |

== First principal round ==
=== Summary ===
| Team 1 | Score | Team 2 |
|---|---|---|
3 October 1937
| Nordstern | 2–0 | Concordia Basel |
| Luzern | 3–0 | Locarno |
| Vevey Sports | 7–2 | Stade Lausanne |
| Monthey | 5–3 | Montreux-Sports |
| FC Tramelan | 6–3 | FC Xamax (Neuchâtel) |
| La Chaux-de-Fonds | 1–0 | Concordia Yverdon |
| Young Boys | 2–1 | Bern |
| FC Nidau | 1–4 | US Bienne-Boujean |
| FC Breite (Basel) | 2–10 | Basel |
| Bellinzona | 1–0 | GC Luganesi |
| Grasshopper Club | 6–1 | Baden |
| Kreuzlingen | 3–1 | Brühl |
| Chur | 2–1 | FC Lachen |
| FC Schaffhausen | 3–2 (a.e.t.) | FC Tössfeld (Winterthur) |
| Young Fellows | 5–1 | Blue Stars |
| FC Oerlikon (ZH) | 1–0 | Zürich |
| Kickers Luzern | 1–3 | Juventus Zürich |
| St. Gallen | 3–2 (a.e.t.) | Winterthur |
| FC Altstetten (Zürich) | 2–0 | FC Töss (Winterthur) |
| Zofingen | 3–2 | FC Schönenwerd |
| Lugano | 8–0 | Chiasso |
| FC Renens | 1–2 | Urania Genève Sport |
| Lausanne-Sport | 4–1 | FC Sierre |
| FC Forward Morges | 0–0 (a.e.t.); Awd 3–0 * | Racing-Club Lausanne |
| Servette | 3–0 | USI Dopolavoro Genève |
| Black Stars | 1–6 | Aarau |
| FC Olten | 2–1 | SC Derendingen |
| Cantonal Neuchâtel | 2–3 | Biel-Bienne |
| Grenchen | 4–2 | Solothurn |
| FC Porrentruy | 2–1 (a.e.t.) | Old Boys |
| Fribourg | 3–2 | FC Helvetia Bern |
10 October 1937
| SC Zug | 2–2 (a.e.t.) | Wohlen |

Replay

| Team 1 | Score | Team 2 |
|---|---|---|
3 October 1937
| Wohlen | 0–2 | SC Zug |

- Note: Match Forward Morges–Racing Lausanne awarded 3–0 for Forward Morges, because the player Ruosch of Racing Lausanne was not qualified.

=== Matches ===
3 October 1937
13:30

| FC Breite | 2–10 | Basel |
|---|---|---|
| Alt 8' (1:0); Alt (2:8) | FCB summary | 30' (1:1) Ibach (1:2) Ibach; 41' (1:3) Monnard (1:4) Weber (1:5) Monnard (1:6) Schaller (1:7) Monnard (1:8) Monnard (2:9) Monnard; 90' (2:10) Weber |

Stadion Rankhof, Basel
Attendance: 3,000
Referee: (Switzerland) Hans Enderli (Winterthur)
- FC Breite played the 1937/38 season in the 2. Liga (third tier), Basel in the Nationalliga (top-tier).

3 October 1937

| FC Oerlikon | 1–0 | Zürich |
|---|---|---|
| Rampp 76' (1:0) | FCZ summary | (red card) 60' Walter Müller |

Neudorf, Zürich
Attendance: 300
Referee: (Switzerland) Meissner, (St. Gallen)
- Oerlikon played the 1937/38 season in the 2. Liga (third tier), Zürich in the 1. Liga (second tier).

3 October 1937

| Servette | 3–0 | USI Dopolavoro Genève |
|---|---|---|
| Belli (1:0); Belli (2:0); Belli (3:0) | Servette summary |

Stade des Charmilles, Geneva
- Dopolavoro Genève played the 1937/38 season in the 2. Liga (third tier) and achieved promotion that season, Servette played in the Nationalliga (top-tier).

3 October 1937

| Black Stars | 1–6 | Aarau |
|---|---|---|
| Goal | FCA summary | Goal |

Buschweilerhof, Basel
- Black Stars played the 1937/38 season in the 2. Liga (third tier), Aarau in the 1. Liga (second tier).

== Round 2 ==
=== Summary ===
| Team 1 | Score | Team 2 |
|---|---|---|
7 November 1937'
| Nordstern | 0–1 | Luzern |
| Vevey Sports | 1–0 | Monthey |
| FC Tramelan | 1–2 | La Chaux-de-Fonds |
| Young Boys | 2–1 | Biel-Bienne |
| Basel | 5–1 | Bellinzona |
| Grasshopper Club | 2–0 | Kreuzlingen |
| Chur | 0–2 | FC Schaffhausen |
| Young Fellows | 5–0 | FC Oerlikon (ZH) |
| Juventus Zürich | 2–5 | St. Gallen |
| SC Zug | 1–0 | FC Altstetten (Zürich) |
| Zofingen | 2–5 | Lugano |
| Urania Genève Sport | 0–2 | Lausanne-Sport |
| FC Forward Morges | 1–2 | Servette |
| Aarau | 2–0 | FC Olten |
| Biel-Bienne | 1–2 | Grenchen |
| FC Porrentruy | 1–0 | Fribourg |

=== Matches ===
7 November 1937
12:45

| Basel | 5–1 | Bellinzona |
|---|---|---|
| Monnard 65' (1:1); Schaller 73' (2:1); Saner 74' (3:1); Monnard 79' (4:1); Monnard 87' (4:1) | FCB summary | 35' (0:1) Bernasconi |

Stadion Rankhof, Basel
Attendance: 4,500
Referee: (Switzerland) Marti (Bern) 65 73 Schaller, 79 87 Monnard, 73 Saner
- Bellinzona played the 1937/38 season in the 1. Liga (second tier).

7 November 1937

| FC Forward Morges | 1–2 | Servette |
|---|---|---|
| Anchise 82' (1:2) | Servette summary | 33' (0:1) Aeby; 50' (0:2) Aeby |

Parc des Sports, Morges
- Forward Morges played the 1937/38 season in the 1. Liga (second tier).

7 November 1937

| Aarau | 2–0 | FC Olten |
|---|---|---|
| Goal | FCA summary |

Stadion Brügglifeld, Aarau
- Aarau played the 1937/38 season in the 1. Liga (second tier), Olten in the 2. Liga (third tier).

== Round 3 ==
=== Summary ===
| Team 1 | Score | Team 2 |
|---|---|---|
5 December 1937
| La Chaux-de-Fonds | 2–1 | Young Boys |
| Basel | 0–1 | Grasshopper Club |
| Young Fellows | 3–2 | FC Schaffhausen |
| St. Gallen | 7–4 (a.e.t.) | SC Zug |
| Lugano | 2–0 | Luzern |
| Servette | 6–0 | Aarau |
| Grenchen | 4–1 | FC Porrentruy |
| Vevey Sports | 1–1 (a.e.t.) * | Lausanne-Sport |

- Note: The match Vevey–Lausanne was abandoned at 95' (too dark) and replayed.

Replay

| Team 1 | Score | Team 2 |
|---|---|---|
2 January 1938
| Lausanne-Sport | 5–1 | Vevey Sports |

=== Matches ===
5 December 1937
14:30

| Basel | 0–1 | Grasshopper Club |
|---|---|---|
| | FCB summary | 10' (0:1) Rupf |

Landhof, Basel
Attendance: 7,000
Referee: (Switzerland) Ernest Meyer (Lausanne)

5 December 1937

| Servette | 6–0 | Aarau |
|---|---|---|
| Aeby (1:0); Buchoux (2:0); Tanner (3:0); Tanner (4:0); Walaschek (5:0); V. Ciseri (6:0) | Servette summary |

Stade des Charmilles, Geneva

== Quarter-finals ==
=== Summary ===
| Team 1 | Score | Team 2 |
|---|---|---|
13 February 1938
| Young Fellows | 7–2 | St. Gallen |
| Lugano | 2–0 | Lausanne-Sport |
| Servette | 2–1 | Grenchen |
| La Chaux-de-Fonds | ppd | Grasshopper Club |

Rescheduled

| Team 1 | Score | Team 2 |
|---|---|---|
23 February 1938
| Grasshopper Club | 2–1 | La Chaux-de-Fonds |

=== Matches ===
13 February 1938

| Servette | 2–1 | Grenchen |
|---|---|---|
| 60' (o.g.); Tanner 90' (2:1) | Servette summary | 88' (1:1) |

Stade des Charmilles, Geneva

== Semi-finals ==
=== Summary ===
| Team 1 | Score | Team 2 |
|---|---|---|
6 March 1938
| Young Fellows | 1–4 | Grasshopper Club |
| Servette | 5–4 | Lugano |

=== Matches ===
6 March 1938

| Young Fellows | 1–4 | Grasshopper Club |
|---|---|---|
| Deriaz 88' (1:4) | RSSSF summary | 34' (0:1) Rupf; 67' (0:4) Rupf; 74' (0:3) Bickel; 78' (0:4) Max Abegglen |

Letzigrund, Zürich
Attendance: 9,000
Referee: (Switzerland) Albert Feurer (Basel)

6 March 1938

| Servette | 5–4 | Lugano |
|---|---|---|
| Aeby 17' (1:0); Tanner 39' (2:0); Aeby 50' (3:0); Belli 95' (4:3); A. Abegglen 110' (pen.) | Servette summary | 55' (3:1) Amadò; 70' (3:2) Bosoni; 75' (3:3) Andreoli; 99' (4:4) Andreoli |

Wankdorf Stadium, Bern
Attendance: 7,000
Referee: Alfred Spengler (Erlenbach, Switzerland)

== Final ==
The final was traditionally held in the capital Bern, at the former Wankdorf Stadium, on Easter Monday 1938.

=== Summary ===
| Team 1 | Score | Team 2 |
|---|---|---|
18 April 1938
| Grasshopper Club | 2–2 (a.e.t.) | Servette |

Replay

| Team 1 | Score | Team 2 |
|---|---|---|
19 June 1938
| Grasshopper Club | 5–1 | Servette |

=== Telegram ===
18 April 1938

| Grasshopper Club | 2–2 (a.e.t.) | Servette |
|---|---|---|
| Bickel 6' (1:0); Artimovicz 44' (2:1) | Fussball-Schweiz summary | 31' (1:1) Wenger; 76' (pen.) A. Abegglen |

Wankdorf Stadium, Bern
Attendance: 18,000
Referee: (Switzerland) Karl Wunderlin (Basel)

19 June 1938
Replay

| Grasshopper Club | 5–1 | Servette |
|---|---|---|
| Artimovicz 2' (1:0); Fauguel 19' (2:0); Rupf 56' (3:1); Fauguel 68' (4:1); Fauguel 81' (5:1) | Fussball-Schweiz summary | 41' (2:1) Walaschek |

Wankdorf Stadium, Bern
Attendance: 16,000
Referee: (Switzerland) Ernest Meyer (Lausanne)

The cup final replay could only be played two months after the first match, following the 1938 World Cup in France. Several players were rested in the World Cup quarterfinals for this cup final. André Abegglen missed a penalty during the first half. Grasshopper Club won the cup and this was the club's sixth cup title to this date.

== Further in Swiss football ==
- 1937–38 Nationalliga
- 1937–38 Swiss 1. Liga
- 1937–38 FC Basel season
- 1937–38 BSC Young Boys season

== Sources ==
- Fussball-Schweiz
- FCB Cup games 1937–38 at fcb-achiv.ch
- Switzerland 1937–38 at RSSSF

| Preceded by 1936–37 | Swiss Cup seasons | Succeeded by 1938–39 |
