= Franz Sattler =

German footballer

Personal information
- Full name: Franz Sattler
- Date of birth: 22 October 1911
- Place of birth: Austria
- Date of death: 28 June 1991 (aged 79)
- Positions: Midfielder; forward

Senior career*
Years	Team	Apps	(Gls)
1933–1934	Austria Wien		
1935–1936	RC Strasbourg	18	(1)
1936–1938	FC Luzern	28	(2)
1938–1939	FC Basel	33	(1)
- * Club domestic league appearances and goals

Franz Sattler (22 October 1911 – 28 June 1991) was an Austrian footballer who played in the 1930s. He played as midfielder and forward.

Sattler played for Austria Wien in the 1934–35 Austrian football championship, ending the season as runners-up. He then moved to RC Strasbourg in the summer of 1935 to play the 1935–36 season with them. One year later he moved on to FC Luzern and played in the 1936–37 Nationalliga season and the first half of the 1937–38 Nationalliga season.

Then in the winter break of their 1937–38 season Sattler joined Basel's first team under head coach Fernand Jaccard. After one test match Sattler played his domestic league debut for his new club in the home game at the Landhof on 16 January 1938 as Basel won 2–0 against Biel-Bienne.

He scored his first goal for the club in the Swiss Cup one year later, on 8 January 1939, in the home game at the Landhof against Concordia Basel as Basel won 3–2. He scored his first goal in the domestic league for Basel on 19 February 1939 in the away game against Luzern. But it did not save the team as Basel were defeated 4–3.

In his short time, one and a half seasons, by Basel Sattler played a total of 44 games for the club scoring the afore mentioned two goals. 33 of these games were in the Nationalliga, two in the Swiss Cup and nine were friendly games.

Sattler was recalled home to Austria as the second world war broke out.

== Sources ==
- Rotblau: Jahrbuch Saison 2017/2018. Publisher: FC Basel Marketing AG. ISBN 978-3-7245-2189-1
- Die ersten 125 Jahre. Publisher: Josef Zindel im Friedrich Reinhardt Verlag, Basel. ISBN 978-3-7245-2305-5
- Verein "Basler Fussballarchiv" Homepage
