= 1937–38 BSC Young Boys season =

BSC Young Boys
1937–38 season
- Chairman: G. Marchand
- Manager: Hans Pulver
- Stadium: Stadion Wankdorf
- Nationalliga: 3rd
- Swiss Cup: Round 2

The 1937–38 season was the 39th season in the history of Berner Sport Club Young Boys. The team played their home games at Stadion Wankdorf in Bern and placed 3rd in the Nationalliga, and was eliminated in the second round of the Swiss Cup.

== Players ==
- François Meystre
- Max Horisberger
- Walter Jäggi
- Fritz Lehmann
- Hans Liniger
- Fritz Künzi
- Aldo Poretti
- Christian Sydler
- István Lukács
- Bacher
- Paul Aebi

== Friendlies ==
Win Draw Loss

19 September 1937 Friendly	Servette	7–4	Young Boys	Geneva
	Buchoux; Bohny; Alpsteg			Stadium: Charmilles Stadium

== Competitions ==
=== Overall record ===
Competition	First match	Last match	Starting round	Final position	Record							
Competition	First match	Last match	Starting round	Final position	Pld	W	D	L	GF	GA	GD	Win %
Nationalliga	29 August 1937	29 May 1938	Matchday 1	3rd	22	11	6	5	39	29	+10	50.00
Swiss Cup	3 October 1937	5 December 1937	1st principal round	Round 2	3	2	0	1	5	4	+1	66.67
Total					25	13	6	6	44	33	+11	52.00

Source: Competitions

=== Nationalliga ===
==== League table ====
Pos	Team	Pld	W	D	L	GF	GA	GD	Pts	Qualification or relegation
1	Lugano	22	12	6	4	46	28	+18	30	Swiss Champions
2	Grasshopper Club	22	13	3	6	50	26	+24	29	Swiss Cup winners
3	Young Boys	22	11	6	5	39	29	+10	28	
4	Basel	22	12	3	7	48	31	+17	27	
5	Nordstern Basel	22	11	4	7	32	29	+3	26	

Source: rsssf.com
Rules for classification: 1) Points; 2) Goal difference within the league, however with play-off for qualifiers;

==== Matches ====
29 August 1937 Round 1	Luzern	0–3	Young Boys	Lucerne
			István Lukács 46', 85'; Aldo Poretti 49'	Stadium: Stadion Allmend; Attendance: 3,600; Referee: (Switzerland) Alfred Spengler

5 September 1937 Round 2	FC Lugano	4–3	Young Boys	Lugano
				Stadium: Campo Marzio; Attendance: 1,000; Referee: (Switzerland) Walter Jordan

12 September 1937 Round 3	Young Boys	4–0	Young Fellows Zürich	Bern
				Stadium: Stadion Wankdorf; Attendance: 3,500; Referee: (Switzerland) Eduard Iseli

26 September 1937 Round 4	FC Biel-Bienne	2–0	Young Boys	Biel/Bienne
				Stadium: Stadion Gurzelen; Attendance: 2,200; Referee: Ernest Meyer

17 October 1937 Round 5	Young Boys	4–0	FC Lausanne-Sport	Bern
				Stadium: Stadion Wankdorf; Attendance: 4,000; Referee: (Switzerland) Marcel Dupuis

24 October 1937 Round 6	FC Nordstern Basel	3–1	Young Boys	Basel
				Stadium: Stadion Rankhof; Attendance: 5,000; Referee: (Switzerland) Eduard Iseli

21 November 1937 Round 7	Young Boys	0–0	FC Bern	Bern
				Stadium: Stadion Wankdorf; Attendance: 5,000; Referee: (Switzerland) William Bangerter

28 November 1937 Round 8	Grasshopper Club Zürich	3–3	Young Boys	Zürich
				Stadium: Hardturm; Attendance: 5,000; Referee: (Switzerland) Felix Herren

12 December 1937 Round 9	Young Boys	2–2	FC Grenchen	Bern
				Stadium: Stadion Wankdorf; Attendance: 3,500; Referee: (Switzerland) Rodolphe Wittwer

19 December 1937 Round 10	Servette	2–2	Young Boys	Geneva
				Stadium: Charmilles Stadium; Attendance: 4,500; Referee: (Switzerland) Ernest Meyer

26 December 1937 Round 11	Young Boys	1–0	Basel	Wankdorf Stadium, Bern
	Lukacs	Summary		Attendance: 3,500; Referee: (Switzerland) Iseli Biel/Bienne

9 January 1938 Round 12	Young Boys	1–1	Luzern	Bern
				Stadium: Stadion Wankdorf; Attendance: 2,500; Referee: (Switzerland) William Bangerter

23 January 1938 Round 14	Young Fellows Zürich	2–4	Young Boys	Zürich
				Stadium: Letzigrund; Attendance: 4,500; Referee: (Switzerland) Karl Wunderlin

13 February 1938 Round 15	Young Boys	4–2	FC Biel-Bienne	Bern
				Stadium: Stadion Wankdorf; Attendance: 3,500; Referee: (Switzerland) Huber

20 February 1938 Round 16	FC Lausanne-Sport	3–1	Young Boys	Lausanne
				Stadium: Stade olympique de la Pontaise; Attendance: 3,500; Referee: (Switzerland) Karl Wunderlin

27 February 1938 Round 17	Young Boys	2–1	FC Nordstern Basel	Bern
				Stadium: Stadion Wankdorf; Attendance: 2,000; Referee: (Switzerland) Alfred Spengler

20 March 1938 Round 18	FC Bern	0–1	Young Boys	Bern
			Graf 75'	Stadium: Stadion Neufeld; Attendance: 4,500; Referee: (Switzerland) Ernest Meyer

27 March 1938 Round 19	Young Boys	1–0	Grasshopper Club Zürich	Bern
	Schmutz 35'			Stadium: Stadion Wankdorf; Attendance: 4,000; Referee: (Switzerland) Mario Grassi

10 April 1938 Round 20	FC Grenchen	1–0	Young Boys	Grenchen
	Knecht 80'			Stadium: Stadion Brühl; Attendance: 2,500; Referee: (Switzerland) Eduard Iseli

24 April 1938 Round 21	Young Boys	1–0	Servette	Bern
	Christian Sydler 65'			Stadium: Stadion Wankdorf; Attendance: 3,000; Referee: (Switzerland) Ernest Meyer

15 May 1938 Round 22	Basel	0–0	Young Boys	Landhof, Basel
15:00		Summary		Attendance: 4,500; Referee: (Switzerland) Spengler Olten

29 May 1938 Round 13	Young Boys	4–3	FC Lugano	Bern
				Stadium: Stadion Wankdorf; Attendance: 4,500; Referee: (Switzerland) Ernest Meyer

=== Swiss Cup ===
3 October 1937 1st principal round	Young Boys	2–1	FC Bern	Bern
				Stadium: Stadion Wankdorf

7 November 1937 Round 1	Young Boys	2–1	FC Bözingen	Bern
				Stadium: Stadion Wankdorf

5 December 1937 Round 2	FC La Chaux-de-Fonds	2–1	Young Boys	La Chaux-de-Fonds
				Stadium: Parc des Sports
