= Eduard Irniger =

Swiss footballer

Personal information
- Full name: Eduard Irniger
- Date of birth: unknown
- Place of birth: Switzerland
- Position: Forward

Senior career*
Years	Team	Apps	(Gls)
1938	FC Basel	5	(0)
1938–1940	La Chaux-de-Fonds	23	(6)
1940–1955	Luzern	135	(21)
- * Club domestic league appearances and goals

Eduard Irniger was a Swiss footballer who played for FC Basel, La Chaux-de-Fonds and Luzern. He played mainly in the position as striker, but also as midfielder.

== Football career ==
Irniger joined Basel's first team for their 1938–39 season under head coach Fernand Jaccard. Irniger played his domestic league debut for the club in the home game in the Landhof on 25 September 1938 as Basel won 4–1 against Luzern. He stayed with the club only half a season and during this time he played a total of five games for Basel without scoring a goal. All five of these games were in the Nationalliga.

Following his short time with Basel, Irniger moved on to play for La Chaux-de-Fonds for one and a half seasons. Then he moved to Luzern, where he stayed for the rest of his active career.

== Sources ==
- Rotblau: Jahrbuch Saison 2017/2018. Publisher: FC Basel Marketing AG. ISBN 978-3-7245-2189-1
- Die ersten 125 Jahre. Publisher: Josef Zindel im Friedrich Reinhardt Verlag, Basel. ISBN 978-3-7245-2305-5
- Verein "Basler Fussballarchiv" Homepage

(NB: Despite all efforts, the editors of these books and the authors in "Basler Fussballarchiv" have failed to be able to identify all the players, their date and place of birth or date and place of death, who played in the games during the early years of FC Basel)
