= 1937–38 Swiss 1. Liga =

1. Liga
- Season: 1937–38
- Champions: 1. Liga champions: La Chaux-de-Fonds; Group West winners: La Chaux-de-Fonds; Group East winners: St. Gallen
- Promoted: La Chaux-de-Fonds
- Relegated: FC Porrentruy; SC Derendingen; FC Schaffhausen; Kickers Luzern
- Matches: 2x 132; 1 decider plus 2 play-offs

The 1937–38 1. Liga season was the 7th season of the 1. Liga since its creation in 1931. At this time, the 1. Liga was the second-tier of the Swiss football league system.

== Overview ==
There were 24 clubs that competed in the 1. Liga this season. They were divided into two regional groups, each with 12 teams. The teams in each group played a double round-robin to decide their league position. Two points were awarded for a win and one point was awarded for a draw. Both group winners then contested a play-off round to decide the championship and promotion to the top-tier Nationalliga. The two last placed teams in each group were directly relegated to the 2. Liga (third tier).

== Group West ==
=== Teams, locations ===
Club	Based in	Canton	Stadium	Capacity
FC Aarau	Aarau	Aargau	Stadion Brügglifeld	9,240
FC Cantonal Neuchâtel	Neuchâtel	Neuchâtel	Stade de la Maladière	25,500
FC Concordia Yverdon	Yverdon-les-Bains	Vaud	Stade Municipal	6,600
SC Derendingen	Derendingen	Solothurn	Heidenegg	1,500
FC La Chaux-de-Fonds	La Chaux-de-Fonds	Neuchâtel	Centre Sportif de la Charrière	10,000
FC Monthey	Monthey	Valais	Stade Philippe Pottier	1,800
FC Montreux-Sports	Montreux	Vaud	Stade de Chailly	1,000
FC Forward Morges	Morges	Vaud	Parc des Sports	600
FC Porrentruy	Porrentruy	Jura	Stade du Tirage	4,226
FC Solothurn	Solothurn	Solothurn	Stadion FC Solothurn	6,750
Urania Genève Sport	Genève	Geneva	Stade de Frontenex	4,000
Vevey Sports	Vevey	Vaud	Stade de Copet	4,000

=== Final league table ===
Pos	Team	Pld	W	D	L	GF	GA	GD	Pts	Qualification or relegation
1	FC La Chaux-de-Fonds	22	16	2	4	78	31	+47	34	To promotion play-off
2	Vevey Sports	22	13	4	5	57	34	+23	30	
3	FC Aarau	22	12	1	9	55	46	+9	25	
4	FC Cantonal Neuchâtel	22	10	5	7	36	32	+4	25	
5	Urania Genève Sport	22	10	5	7	43	46	−3	25	
6	FC Concordia Yverdon	22	8	8	6	24	30	−6	24	
7	FC Montreux-Sports	22	9	3	10	37	41	−4	21	
8	FC Forward Morges	22	8	4	10	25	33	−8	20	
9	FC Solothurn	22	6	6	10	33	42	−9	18	
10	FC Monthey	22	7	4	11	33	56	−23	18	
11	FC Porrentruy	22	5	7	10	34	40	−6	17	Relegation to 2. Liga
12	SC Derendingen	22	1	5	16	30	54	−24	7	Relegation to 2. Liga

Source: RSSSF
Rules for classification: 1) Points; 2) Goal difference within the league, but decider play-off for qualifiers.

== Group East ==
=== Teams, locations ===
Club	Based in	Canton	Stadium	Capacity
AC Bellinzona	Bellinzona	Ticino	Stadio Comunale Bellinzona	5,000
FC Blue Stars Zürich	Zürich	Zürich	Hardhof	1,000
SC Brühl	St. Gallen	St. Gallen	Paul-Grüninger-Stadion	4,200
FC Chiasso	Chiasso	Ticino	Stadio Comunale Riva IV	4,000
FC Concordia Basel	Basel	Basel-Stadt	Stadion Rankhof	7,000
SC Juventus Zürich	Zürich	Zürich	Utogrund	2,850
FC Kickers Luzern	Lucerne	Lucerne	Stadion Auf Tribschen	2,950
FC Locarno	Locarno	Ticino	Stadio comunale Lido	5,000
FC Schaffhausen	Schaffhausen	Schaffhausen	Stadion Breite	7,300
FC St. Gallen	St. Gallen	St. Gallen	Espenmoos	11,000
FC Winterthur	Winterthur	Zürich	Schützenwiese	8,550
FC Zürich	Zürich	Zürich	Letzigrund	25,000

=== Final league table ===
Pos	Team	Pld	W	D	L	GF	GA	GD	Pts	Qualification or relegation
1	FC St. Gallen	22	12	5	5	51	34	+17	29	To promotion play-off
2	FC Concordia Basel	22	11	6	5	39	33	+6	28	
3	SC Brühl	22	10	7	5	43	26	+17	27	
4	FC Zürich	22	10	6	6	50	36	+14	26	
5	FC Blue Stars Zürich	22	9	6	7	48	37	+11	24	
6	SC Juventus Zürich	22	9	5	8	38	40	−2	23	
7	FC Winterthur	22	6	7	9	58	54	+4	19	
8	AC Bellinzona	22	7	5	10	30	37	−7	19	
9	FC Locarno	22	5	9	8	33	43	−10	19	
10	FC Chiasso	22	5	7	10	23	42	−19	17	Decider tenth/eleventh position
11	FC Kickers Luzern	22	6	5	11	43	57	−14	17	Decider tenth/eleventh position
12	FC Schaffhausen	22	6	4	12	23	40	−17	16	Relegation to 2. Liga

Source: RSSSF
Rules for classification: 1) Points; 2) Goal difference within the league, but decider play-off for qualifiers.

=== Decider for tenth place ===
Because Chiasso and Kickers Luzern finished level on points. A decider for tenth and eleventh place was required, because eleventh place was the direct relegation slot. The decider was played on 28 June in Zug.

Team 1	Score	Team 2
Chiasso	2–1	Kickers Luzern

Chiasso won and remained in the division for the next season. Kickers Luzern were relegated to the 2. Liga.

== Promotion ==
The two group winners played a two legged tie for the title of 1. Liga champions and for promotion to the 1938–39 Nationalliga. The games were played on 5 and 12 June 1938.

=== Promotion play-off ===
Team 1	Score	Team 2
St. Gallen	1–2	La Chaux-de-Fonds
La Chaux-de-Fonds	2–2	St. Gallen

La Chaux-de-Fonds won the 1. Liga championship title and were promoted to 1938–39 Nationalliga. St. Gallen remained in the division for the next season.

== Further in Swiss football ==
- 1937–38 Nationalliga
- 1937–38 Swiss Cup

== Sources ==
- Switzerland 1937–38 at RSSSF

Preceded by 1936–37	Seasons in Swiss 1. Liga	Succeeded by 1938–39
