= Gottfried Havlicek =

Austrian footballer

Gottlieb Havlicek
Personal information
- Full name: Gottlieb Havlicek
- Date of birth: 27 September 1910
- Place of birth: Vienna
- Position: Forward

Senior career*
Years	Team	Apps	(Gls)
1933–1935	RC Strasbourg	42	(11)
1935–1936	OFC Charleville		
1936–1937	FC Basel	6	(0)
- * Club domestic league appearances and goals

Gottlieb Havlicek (born 27 September 1910 in Vienna ) was an Austrian footballer who played in the 1930s. He played as a forward.

Havlicek played for RC Strasbourg in the 1933–34 French Division 2. The team finished the season in fourth position, but because FC Rouen waived, Strasbourg were promoted. Havlicek played 25 games, scoring 10 goals. In the following season the team were playing along with good chances for the championship. Havlicek played 17 games, scoring one goal.

After these two successful seasons Havlicek moved on to play for OFC Charleville in the 1935–36 French Division 2.

Havlicek joined Basel's first team for their 1936–37 season. He made his domestic league debut for his new club on 29 November 1937 in a goalless draw away to La Chaux-de-Fonds.

During his season with Basel, Havlicek played seven games and scored once. Six games were in the Swiss Serie A and the other was a friendly game against Ferencvárosi TC. He scored his only goal in this match.

== Sources ==
- Rotblau: Jahrbuch Saison 2017/2018. Publisher: FC Basel Marketing AG. ISBN 978-3-7245-2189-1
- Die ersten 125 Jahre. Publisher: Josef Zindel im Friedrich Reinhardt Verlag, Basel. ISBN 978-3-7245-2305-5
- Verein "Basler Fussballarchiv" Homepage
