= Federico Schott =

Swiss footballer

Personal information
- Full name: Federico Schott
- Date of birth: 1910
- Place of birth: Switzerland
- Position: Forward

Senior career*
Years	Team	Apps	(Gls)
1933–1935	Grasshopper Club	22	(12)
1935	Young Boys	2	(0)
1935–1936	FC Basel	10	(4)
1936–1937	Lugano	13	(7)
- * Club domestic league appearances and goals

Federico Schott (1910 – after 1938), known as Fritz Schott, was a Swiss footballer who played for FC Basel as a forward.

In the 1933–34 season Schott played for Grasshopper Club. They ended the league season as runners-up and Schott scored 11 goals in 17 appearances. In the Swiss Cup the team advanced to the final, which was played un 2 April 1934 at Wankdorf Stadium, in Bern. Schott played in the final and in the 43rd minute he scored the first goal of the game as the Grasshoppers won by two goals to nil. During the following season Schott did not obtain as much playing time and so in the middle of the season he moved on to join Young Boys Bern.

Schott joined Basel's first team for their 1935–36 season. After six test games in which he scored five goals, he made his domestic league debut for his new club in the away game against St. Gallen on 25 August 1935. Although he scored his first league goal for Basel in this game, it did not save the team from being defeated by two goals to three.

During this season Schott played 18 games for Basel and scored nine goals; 11 games were in the Swiss Serie A, 1 in the Swiss Cup and 7 were friendly games. He scored four goals in the domestic league and the other five in the test games.

After his season with Basel, Schott moved on to play Lugano.

== Sources ==
- Rotblau: Jahrbuch Saison 2017/2018. Publisher: FC Basel Marketing AG. ISBN 978-3-7245-2189-1
- Die ersten 125 Jahre. Publisher: Josef Zindel im Friedrich Reinhardt Verlag, Basel. ISBN 978-3-7245-2305-5
- Verein "Basler Fussballarchiv" Homepage
