= Hugo Burkhardt =

Swiss footballer (born 1910)

Personal information
- Full name: Hugo Burkhardt
- Date of birth: 1910
- Place of birth: Switzerland
- Position: Goalkeeper

Senior career*
Years	Team	Apps	(Gls)
1933–1935	Concordia Basel	43	(0)
1935–1936	FC Basel	8	(0)
- * Club domestic league appearances and goals

Hugo Burkhardt (born 1910; date of death unknown) was a Swiss footballer who played for Concordia Basel and FC Basel. He played as goalkeeper.

Burkhardt was the main goalkeeper for Concordia Basel during the 1933–34 and 1934–35 Nationalliga seasons. After Concordia suffered relegation, Burkhardt joined Basel's first team for their 1935–36 season. He played his domestic league debut for the club in the away game on 25 August 1935 as Basel lost 2–3 against St. Gallen.

During that season Burkhardt played a total of 12 games for Basel. Eight of these games were in the Nationalliga, one in the Swiss Cup and three were friendly games.

== Sources ==
- Rotblau: Jahrbuch Saison 2017/2018. Publisher: FC Basel Marketing AG. ISBN 978-3-7245-2189-1
- Die ersten 125 Jahre. Publisher: Josef Zindel im Friedrich Reinhardt Verlag, Basel. ISBN 978-3-7245-2305-5
- Verein "Basler Fussballarchiv" Homepage
