= Oscar Rauch =

Swiss footballer (1907–1991)

Personal information
- Full name: Oskar Rauch
- Position: Midfielder

Senior career*
Years	Team	Apps	(Gls)
1933–1940	Grasshopper Club Zürich		

International career
1933–1939	Switzerland	5	(0)
- * Club domestic league appearances and goals

Oscar Rauch (1907–1991) was a Swiss footballer who played for Switzerland in the 1938 FIFA World Cup. He also played for Grasshopper Club Zürich. He won two Swiss league titles there.
