= René Schaller =

Swiss footballer (born 1915)

Personal information
- Full name: René Schaller
- Date of birth: 1915
- Place of birth: Switzerland
- Position: Forward

Senior career*
Years	Team	Apps	(Gls)
1933–1937	FC La Chaux-de-Fonds	85	(42)
1937–1939	FC Basel	14	(5)
- * Club domestic league appearances and goals

René Schaller (1915 – after 1938) was a Swiss footballer who played in the 1930s. He played as a forward.

Schaller played for La Chaux-de-Fonds from 1933 to 1937 and was a successful goal scorer. He played his league debut in the La Chaux-de-Fonds team in the 1933–34 Nationalliga season. In the 1935–36 Nationalliga season he played in all 26 league games scoring 16 of the team's 47 goals, saving his team from relegation as they ended the season in 12th position just one point above the relegation slot. Again in the following season he scored 12 goals in 22 outings. But because La Chaux-de-Fonds and FC Basel both had 20 points, they had to have a play-off against relegation. This ended in a draw and so a replay was required. The replay was played in the Stadion Neufeld in Bern on 20 June 1937 and ended in a 1–0 victory for Basel and La Chaux-de-Fonds were relegated.

Schaller moved on and joined Basel's first team for their 1937–38 season under player-manager Fernand Jaccard. After playing two test games, Schaller made his domestic league debut for his new club in the home game at the Landhof on 29 August 1937 as Basel won 1–0 against Young Fellows Zürich. He scored his first league goal for the club in the next game on 5 September away to Biel-Bienne. It was the last goal of the game as Basel won 3–1.

In the following season Schaller played in just three test games. He was injured during the pre-season test game against German club Freiburger FC and that was his final appearance for the club. In the short period that he was with Basel Schaller played 22 games and scored nine goals; 14 games were in the Nationalliga, 2 were in the Swiss Cup and 6 were friendlies. He scored five goals in the domestic league, two in the Swiss Cup and the other two goals were scored during the test games.

== Sources ==
- Rotblau: Jahrbuch Saison 2017/2018. Publisher: FC Basel Marketing AG. ISBN 978-3-7245-2189-1
- Die ersten 125 Jahre. Publisher: Josef Zindel im Friedrich Reinhardt Verlag, Basel. ISBN 978-3-7245-2305-5
- Verein "Basler Fussballarchiv" Homepage
