= Ludwig Stroh =

Austrian footballer

Personal information
- Full name: Ludwig Stroh
- Date of birth: 2 February 1910
- Place of birth: Austria
- Date of death: 6 July 1990 (aged 80)
- Position: Midfielder

Senior career*
Years	Team	Apps	(Gls)
1933–1935	RC Strasbourg		
1935–1936	FC Basel	7	(0)
1936–1939	FC Rouen		
- * Club domestic league appearances and goals

Ludwig Stroh (2 February 1910 – 6 July 1990) was an Austrian footballer who played for RC Strasbourg, FC Basel and FC Rouen in the 1930s. He played as midfielder.

Stroh joined Basel's first team from RC Strasbourg in the summer of 1935 for their 1935–36 season. He played his domestic league debut for the club in the away game on 25 August as Basel were defeated 2–3 by St. Gallen.

While playing his season for Basel, Stroh played a total of 11 games for the club. Seven of these games were in the Nationalliga, one was in the Swiss Cup and three other games were friendly games.

After his time in Switzerland Stroh returned to France and continued his playing career by FC Rouen.

== Sources ==
- Rotblau: Jahrbuch Saison 2017/2018. Publisher: FC Basel Marketing AG. ISBN 978-3-7245-2189-1
- Die ersten 125 Jahre. Publisher: Josef Zindel im Friedrich Reinhardt Verlag, Basel. ISBN 978-3-7245-2305-5
- Verein "Basler Fussballarchiv" Homepage
