= Eduard Buser =

Swiss footballer (born 1913)

Personal information
- Full name: Eduard Buser
- Date of birth: 25 February 1913
- Place of birth: Switzerland
- Position: Forward

Senior career*
Years	Team	Apps	(Gls)
1931–1932	FC Basel	1	(0)
1937–1939	FC Basel	31	(14)
- * Club domestic league appearances and goals

Eduard Buser (25 February 1913 – after 1938) was a Swiss footballer who played as a forward.

Buser joined FC Basel's first team for the first time for their 1931–32 season. He made his domestic league debut for the club in the away game on 6 September 1931 as Basel were defeated 1–8 by Lugano. This was his only game for the club for some time.

Buser rejoined Basel's first team in their 1937–38 season. In the second half of the season he played regularly. He scored his first goal for Basel on 20 February 1938 in the away game at the Neufeld against FC Bern as Basel won by seven goals to two. He stayed with the club for this and the following season.

Between the years 1931 and 1939 Buser played 43 games for Basel scoring 17 goals; 32 of the games were in the Nationalliga, 2 in the Swiss Cup, and 9 were friendly games. He scored 14 goals in the domestic league, the others were scored during the test games.

== Sources ==
- Rotblau: Jahrbuch Saison 2017/2018. Publisher: FC Basel Marketing AG. ISBN 978-3-7245-2189-1
- Die ersten 125 Jahre. Publisher: Josef Zindel im Friedrich Reinhardt Verlag, Basel. ISBN 978-3-7245-2305-5
- Verein "Basler Fussballarchiv" Homepage
