= Guglielmo Spadini =

Swiss footballer (born 1911)

Personal information
- Full name: Guglielmo Spadini
- Date of birth: October 25, 1911
- Place of birth: Switzerland
- Position: Midfielder

Senior career*
Years	Team	Apps	(Gls)
until 1935	Bottecchia		
1935–1946	FC Basel	110	(23)
- * Club domestic league appearances and goals

Guglielmo Spadini (born 25 October 1911, date of death unknown) was a Swiss footballer who played for FC Basel. He played as midfielder.

Spadini joined Basel's first team in 1935 from local team Bottecchia. After one test game he played his domestic league debut for his new club in the home game at the Landhof on 7 September 1935. He scored his first goal for them in the same game as Basel won 2–1 against Grasshopper Club.

Spadini played eleven seasons for Basel. In his first season (1935–36) for Basel he scored six goals and in Basel's 1936–37 season he was their top goal scorer with 10 goals in 21 appearances. In the home game on 27 September 1936 against Lugano Spadini scored a hat-trick within 11 minutes. But despite this fact, Lugano were able to achieve a 3–3 draw and take a point home with them.

In the season 1938/39 Spadini and his team suffered relegation to the 1 Liga. Although Basel were 1 Liga champions the following season, there was no relegation and no promotion due to the second World War. Again in the 1940/41 season Basel won their 1 Liga group, but in the promotion play-offs Basel were defeated by Cantonal Neuchatel and drew the game with Zürich. Their two play-off opponents were thus promoted and Basel remained for another season in the 1 Liga.

In the season 1941/42 Basel were winners of the 1 Liga group East and played a play-off for promotion of the 1 Liga group West, FC Bern. After a goalless first leg away from home, Basel won the return leg 3–1 and achieved promotion. Spadini played in this return leg, coming in as substitute after Alberto Losa had been injured. In this same season Spadini and Basel also qualified for the Swiss Cup final. This was played on 6 April 1942 in the Wankdorf Stadion against the Nationalliga team Grasshopper Club. The final ended goalless after extra time and thus a replay was required. The replay was on 25 May, again in the Wankdorf Stadion. Basel led by half time 2–0, Fritz Schmidlin had scored both goals, but two goals from Grubenmann a third from Neukom gave the Grasshoppers a 3–2 victory.

Three years later, in the season 1944/45 Spadini and his team were again relegated, from the newly arranged Nationalliga A to the Nationalliga B. But the team achieved immediate promotion as Nationalliga B champions a year later. Spadini ended his active career at the end of this promotional season.

Between the years 1935 and 1946 Spadini played a total of 164 games for Basel scoring a total of 34 goals. 110 of these games were in the Nationalliga and 1st League, 15 games in the Swiss Cup and 39 were friendly games. He scored 23 goal in the domestic league and the others were scored during the test games. Spadini did not score a goal in the cup competition.

== Sources ==
- Rotblau: Jahrbuch Saison 2017/2018. Publisher: FC Basel Marketing AG. ISBN 978-3-7245-2189-1
- Die ersten 125 Jahre. Publisher: Josef Zindel im Friedrich Reinhardt Verlag, Basel. ISBN 978-3-7245-2305-5
- Verein "Basler Fussballarchiv" Homepage
