= Louis Favre (Switzerland footballer) =

Swiss footballer

Personal information
- Place of birth: Switzerland
- Position: Defender

Senior career*
Years	Team	Apps	(Gls)
1935–1936	BSC Young Boys	13	(3)
1936–1946	FC Basel	74	(2)
- * Club domestic league appearances and goals

Louis Favre was a Swiss footballer who played in the 1930s and 1940s. He played as defender.

Favre played the 1935–36 Nationalliga season with Young Boys.

Favre joined Basel's first team in advance of their 1936–37 season. He played his domestic league debut for his new club in the away game on 13 September 1936 as Basel won 3–1 against Nordstern Basel. Favre played ten seasons for Basel. In the season 1938/39 he and the team suffered relegation to the 1 Liga.

Favre scored his first goal for his club on 18 February 1940 in the home game at the Landhof against Concordia Basel. In fact he scored two goals as Basel won 3–2. Although Basel were 1 Liga champions at the end of this season, there was no relegation and no promotion due to the second World War. Again in the 1940/41 season Basel won their 1 Liga group, but in the promotion play-offs Basel were defeated by Cantonal Neuchatel and drew the game with Zürich. Their two play-off opponents were thus promoted and Basel remained for another season in the 1 Liga.

In the 1 Liga season 1941–42 Eugen Rupf was Basel player-coach. Basel finished their season as winners of group East, with 18 victories, 3 draws and only one defeat from 22 games with a total of 39 points, scoring 77 and conceding just 15 goals. The play-offs were then against group West winners Bern, the away tie ending with a goalless draw and Basel won their home tie 3–1 to achieve Promotion. In this same season Favre with Basel also qualified for the Swiss Cup final. This was played on 6 April 1942 in the Wankdorf Stadion against the Nationalliga team Grasshopper Club. The final ended goalless after extra time and thus a replay was required. The replay was on 25 May, again in the Wankdorf Stadion. Basel led by half time 2–0, Fritz Schmidlin had scored both goals, but then two goals from Grubenmann a third from Neukom gave the Grasshoppers a 3–2 victory.

Three years later, in the season 1944/45 Favre and his team were again relegated, from the newly arranged Nationalliga A to the Nationalliga B. But the team achieved immediate promotion as Nationalliga B champions a year later. Favre ended his active career at the end of this season. During his last two years he only played one league game in each of the seasons. All in all, between the years 1936 and 1946 Favre played a total of 119 games for Basel scoring a total of two goals. 74 of these games were in the Nationalliga and 1 Liga, 20 in the Swiss Cup and 25 were friendly games. He scored the two goals in the domestic league.

== Sources ==
- Rotblau: Jahrbuch Saison 2017/2018. Publisher: FC Basel Marketing AG. ISBN 978-3-7245-2189-1
- Die ersten 125 Jahre. Publisher: Josef Zindel im Friedrich Reinhardt Verlag, Basel. ISBN 978-3-7245-2305-5
- Verein "Basler Fussballarchiv" Homepage

(NB: Despite all efforts, the editors of these books and the authors in "Basler Fussballarchiv" have failed to be able to identify all the players, their date and place of birth or date and place of death, who played in the games during the early years of FC Basel)
