= Alwin Riemke =

German footballer (1910–1991)

Personal information
- Date of birth: 2 February 1910
- Date of death: November 1991 (aged 81)
- Place of death: Nuremberg, Germany
- Position: Goalkeeper

Senior career*
Years	Team	Apps	(Gls)
1926–1928	Fortuna Leipzig		
1928–1930	VfB Leipzig (1893)		
1930–1932	1860 Munich		
1932–1934	VfB Leipzig (1893)		
1934–1935	Lausanne-Sport	4	(0)
1934–1935	Basel	4	(0)
1939–1940	1. FC Nürnberg	6	(0)

Managerial career
- 1934–1935: Lausanne-Sport
- 1935–1936: Basel
- 1937–1938: SpVgg Fürth
- 1939–1941: 1. FC Nürnberg
- 1945–1946: 1. FC Nürnberg
- –1947: SpVgg Fürth
- 1948–1950: Bayern Munich
- 1951–1952: 1. FC Nürnberg
- * Club domestic league appearances and goals

Alwin Riemke (2 February 1910 – November 1991) was a German footballer who played in the 1920s and 1930s. He played as goalkeeper. He was also trainer and manager in Switzerland and Germany in the late 1930s and 1940s.

== Playing career ==
Riemke grew up in Leipzig and played two seasons for both local clubs Fortuna Leipzig and VfB Leipzig (1893). He moved on to play two seasons for 1860 Munich and then returned to VfB Leipzig (1893) for another two sessions.

Reimke moved to Switzerland and was employed as professional trainer by Lausanne-Sport. During the 1934–35 Nationalliga season he led the team to win the championship. He acted as player-manager and played in the Lausanne goal on four occasions. Lausanne-Sport also won the Swiss Cup final against Nordstern Basel 10–0 and therefore they completed the national double.

== Managerial career ==
Reimke joined Basel's first team as player-manager for their 1935–36 season. He played his domestic league debut for the club in the home game at the Landhof on 24 November 1935 against Young Fellows Zürich. Surprisingly enough he played as forward in that game and substituted himself out at half time. In that season Riemke played in four games for Basel all in the Nationalliga. The other three games he played as goalkeeper. Basel finished the season in 10th position in the league.

After his time in Switzerland he returned to Germany and was trainer for SpVgg Fürth, 1. FC Nürnberg and Bayern Munich.

== Sources ==
- Rotblau: Jahrbuch Saison 2017/2018. Publisher: FC Basel Marketing AG. ISBN 978-3-7245-2189-1
- Die ersten 125 Jahre. Publisher: Josef Zindel im Friedrich Reinhardt Verlag, Basel. ISBN 978-3-7245-2305-5
- Verein "Basler Fussballarchiv" Homepage
