= Maurice Dubosson =

Swiss footballer

Personal information
- Full name: Maurice Dubosson
- Place of birth: Switzerland
- Position: Forward

Senior career*
Years	Team	Apps	(Gls)
1936–1939	FC Basel	9	(1)
- * Club domestic league appearances and goals

Maurice Dubosson was a Swiss footballer who played for FC Basel as a forward.

Dubosson joined Basel's first team in 1936. After playing in two friendly games, he made his domestic league debut for the club in the away game on 30 August 1936 against FC Bern. It was the first game of Basel's 1936–37 season, and they were defeated. He scored his first goal for his club on 27 November 1938 in the home game at the Landhof against Grenchen as Basel won 2–0.

Between 1936 and 1939 Dubosson played thirteen games for Basel and scored three goals. Nine games were in the Nationalliga and four were friendlies. He scored once in the domestic league and twice during the test games.

== Sources ==
- Rotblau: Jahrbuch Saison 2017/2018. Publisher: FC Basel Marketing AG. ISBN 978-3-7245-2189-1
- Die ersten 125 Jahre. Publisher: Josef Zindel im Friedrich Reinhardt Verlag, Basel. ISBN 978-3-7245-2305-5
- Verein "Basler Fussballarchiv" Homepage
