= 1937–38 Nationalliga =

Swiss football season

Nationalliga
- Season: 1937–38
- Dates: 29 August 1937 to 15 May 1938
- Champions: Lugano
- Relegated: Bern
- Matches: 132
- Top goalscorer: Numa Monnard (Basel); 20 goals

The following is the summary of the Swiss National League in the 1937–38 football season. This was the 41st season of top-tier football in Switzerland.

== Overview ==
For this season, the Swiss Football Association (ASF/SFV) had been reduced to from 13 to just 12 member clubs in the top-tier and 24 clubs in the second-tier. This was one Nationalliga team fewer than in the last season and two teams less than the previous season. This happened because the league format had been modified. From here onwards the format would remain unchanged.

The 12 top-tier teams played a double round-robin to decide their league table positions. Two points were awarded for a win and one point was awarded for a draw. The first placed team at the end of the season would be awarded the Swiss championship title and the last placed team would be relegated to the 1939–40 1. Liga.

== Nationalliga ==
The league season began with the first matchday on 29 August 1937 and was concluded with the last round on 15 May 1938.

=== Teams, locations ===
Team	Based in	Canton	Stadium	Capacity
FC Basel	Basel	Basel-Stadt	Landhof	4,000
FC Bern	Bern	Bern	Stadion Neufeld	14,000
FC Biel-Bienne	Biel/Bienne	Bern	Stadion Gurzelen	5,500
Grasshopper Club Zürich	Zürich	Zürich	Hardturm	20,000
FC Grenchen	Grenchen	Solothurn	Stadium Brühl	15,100
FC Lausanne-Sport	Lausanne	Vaud	Pontaise	30,000
FC Lugano	Lugano	Ticino	Cornaredo Stadium	6,330
FC Luzern	Lucerne	Lucerne	Stadion Allmend	25,000
FC Nordstern Basel	Basel	Basel-Stadt	Rankhof	7,600
Servette FC	Geneva	Geneva	Stade des Charmilles	27,000
BSC Young Boys	Bern	Bern	Wankdorf Stadium	56,000
FC Young Fellows	Zürich	Zürich	Utogrund	2,850

=== Final league table ===
Pos	Team	Pld	W	D	L	GF	GA	GD	Pts	Qualification or relegation
1	Lugano	22	12	6	4	46	28	+18	30	Swiss Champions
2	Grasshopper Club	22	13	3	6	50	26	+24	29	Swiss Cup winners
3	Young Boys	22	11	6	5	39	29	+10	28	
4	Basel	22	12	3	7	48	31	+17	27	
5	Nordstern Basel	22	11	4	7	32	29	+3	26	
6	Lausanne-Sport	22	10	5	7	46	39	+7	25	
7	Servette	22	9	7	6	39	34	+5	25	
8	Young Fellows Zürich	22	9	6	7	46	32	+14	24	
9	Biel-Bienne	22	6	4	12	23	36	−13	16	
10	Grenchen	22	4	7	11	31	51	−20	15	
11	Luzern	22	5	3	14	37	55	−18	13	
12	Bern	22	0	6	16	18	65	−47	6	Relegated to 1938–39 1. Liga

Source: rsssf.com
Rules for classification: 1) Points; 2) Goal difference within the league, however with play-off for qualifiers;

=== Results ===
Home \ Away	BAS	BER	BB	GCZ	GRE	LS	LUG	LUZ	NOR	SER	YB	YFZ
Basel		6–1	2–0	2–1	2–2	4–0	0–2	3–2	1–0	0–1	0–0	1–0
Bern	2–7		1–3	1–2	0–0	1–2	1–1	2–5	0–3	1–1	0–1	1–7
Biel-Bienne	1–3	2–0		0–1	2–0	0–3	0–0	4–2	0–0	1–3	2–0	0–2
Grasshopper Club	4–2	2–0	1–1		2–1	4–2	1–0	7–2	1–0	4–1	3–3	1–1
Grenchen	0–2	1–1	1–0	2–7		2–4	2–2	0–1	2–1	2–2	1–0	2–5
Lausanne-Sports	2–3	4–2	1–2	1–0	3–1		4–3	2–1	6–1	2–2	3–1	3–3
Lugano	3–0	2–0	2–0	2–1	4–3	0–0		3–1	3–0	4–2	4–3	3–1
Luzern	1–6	2–2	4–1	1–3	1–2	4–2	2–2		0–2	2–3	0–3	1–2
Nordstern	4–2	2–1	1–0	1–0	5–3	1–1	0–0	2–1		2–2	3–1	1–0
Servette	1–1	5–1	4–1	0–4	3–0	2–0	1–3	2–0	2–0		2–2	0–3
Young Boys	1–0	0–0	4–2	1–0	2–2	1–0	4–3	1–1	2–1	1–0		4–0
Young Fellows	3–1	7–0	1–1	2–1	2–2	1–1	2–0	1–3	1–2	0–0	2–4	

Source: rsssf.com
Legend: Blue = home team win; Yellow = draw; Red = away team win.

=== Topscorers ===
Rank	Player	Nat.	Goals	Club
1.	Numa Monnard	(Switzerland)	20	Basel
2.	Lauro Amadò	(Switzerland)	18	Lugano
3.	Willy Jäggi	(Switzerland)	17	Lausanne-Sports
3.	István Grósz	(Hungary)	17	Servette

== Further in Swiss football ==
- 1937–38 Swiss Cup
- 1937–38 Swiss 1. Liga

== Sources ==
- Switzerland 1937–38 at RSSSF

Preceded by 1936–37	Nationalliga seasons in Switzerland	Succeeded by 1938–39
