= Numa Monnard =

Swiss footballer (1918–2001)

Personal information
- Date of birth: 23 September 1918
- Place of birth: Hauterive, Neuchâtel Switzerland
- Date of death: 5 September 2001 (aged 82)
- Position: Striker

Youth career
- Cantonal Neuchatel

Senior career*
Years	Team	Apps	(Gls)
1935–1937	Cantonal Neuchatel		
1937–1938	FC Basel	21	(20)
1938–1939	Cantonal Neuchatel		
1939–1942	Servette	67	(45)
1942	Cantonal Neuchatel	9	(3)
1943–1948	Lausanne-Sport	126	(73)
1948–1949	Vevey-Sports	15	(4)
1949–1950	Cantonal Neuchatel	18	(10)
1950–1951	CS La Tour-de-Peilz		
1951–1952	Cantonal Neuchatel	16	(14)
1952–1955	ES Malley	71	(30)

International career
1936–1945	Switzerland	15	(7)
- * Club domestic league appearances and goals

Numa Monnard (23 September 1918 – 5 September 2001) was a Swiss footballer. He played as striker.

== Club career ==
Monnard played his youth football by Cantonal Neuchatel and advanced to their senior team in 1935 and played in the 1. Liga (second tier of Swiss football).

The young forward then joined Basel's first team for their 1937–38 season in the Nationalliga (top tier of Swiss football). After two test games against Freiburger FC and Young Boys Bern (and in both games he scored a goal) he played his domestic league debut for his new club in the home game at the Landhof on 29 August 1937. He scored his first goal for his club in the same game as Basel won 1–0 against Young Fellows Zürich. Monnard was the team's top goal scorer that season. With 20 goals he was the Nationalliga top scorer as well. In the domestic league, in each of his first eight games he scored at least one goal and in the league match against Lausanne-Sport on 12 September he scored a hat-trick as Basel won by four goals to nil.

In the first principal round of the Swiss Cup, as Basel played against lower tier FC Breite, Monard scored five times. In the next cup round Monnard scored a hat-trick against Bellinzona. However in the round of 16 Basel lost 1–0 against Grasshopper Club, who then proceeded and eventually won the cup. In his one season for Basel, including cup and friendlies, Monnard played 29 games in which he netted 34 times. 21 of these games were in the Swiss Serie A, three in the Swiss Cup and five were friendly games. He scored 20 goals in the domestic league, eight goals in the cup competition and the other six were scored during the test games.

After his time in Basel, Monnard returned to Cantonal and played another season for them in the 1. Liga. He then moved on to play three seasons for Servette from 1939 until 1942. In the 1939–40 Nationalliga season Servette won the championship and his team college Georges Aeby became league top scorer.

In the meantime Cantonal had been promoted, Monnard returned to Cantonal for the 1942–43 Nationalliga season. But he stayed there for only a few months and moved on to Lausanne-Sport. In the 1943–44 Nationalliga season Monnard won his second Swiss championship with Lausanne and he was the team's top goal getter, he netted with 14 times. In that season Lausanne also advanced to the Swiss Cup Final, which was played at Wankdorf Stadium in Bern on 10 April 1944. Lausanne beat Basel 3–0 and Monnard scored two of the goals. Monnard stayed with Lausanne-Sport until the 1948–49 Nationalliga A season. He moved on to play for Vevey-Sports in the Nationalliga B, but could not save the team from being relegated.

In the 1948–49 season Monnard again played for Cantonal, who were again playing in the second tier. This season Cantonal under trainer Fernand Jaccard won the Nationalliga B championship and thus promotion. Jaccard had three top goal scorers in his team, Traugott Oberer scored 21, André Facchinetti netted 19 times and Monnard scored 10 goals. Monnard played the 1949–50 season with CS La Tour-de-Peilz but, after just one year, he returned to Cantonal for his fifth period with them.

Monnard ended his active football career with ES Malley. He played with Malley for three seasons.

== International career ==
Monnard played 16 times for the Switzerland national team. He made his debut on 24 May 1936 in the home test game in Basel against Belgium. The game ended in a 1–1 draw. He scored his first goal for his country on 3 April 1938 in the Stadion Rankhof in Basel. It was the first goal of the game as the Swiss won by 4–0 against Czechoslovakia. Despite this promising start to his international career, the Swiss coach at this time Karl Rappan did not select Monnard to play at the 1938 World Cup.

== Sources ==
- Rotblau: Jahrbuch Saison 2017/2018. Publisher: FC Basel Marketing AG. ISBN 978-3-7245-2189-1
- Die ersten 125 Jahre. Publisher: Josef Zindel im Friedrich Reinhardt Verlag, Basel. ISBN 978-3-7245-2305-5
- Verein "Basler Fussballarchiv" Homepage
- Numa Monnard at WorldFootball.net
