= Othmar Saner =

Swiss footballer

Personal information
- Full name: Othmar Saner
- Place of birth: Switzerland
- Position: Forward

Senior career*
Years	Team	Apps	(Gls)
1936–1939	FC Basel	34	(8)
1940–1941	Cantonal Neuchatel		
1942–1943	Young Fellows Zürich	10	(0)
- * Club domestic league appearances and goals

Othmar Saner was a Swiss footballer who played in the late 1930s and early 1940s. He played as a forward.

Saner joined Basel's first team during their 1936–37 season. After one test game, he played his domestic league debut for the club in the away game on 27 December 1936 as Basel were defeated 0–3 by Lausanne-Sport. He scored his first goal for his club on 28 February 1937 in the away game at the Charmilles Stadium against Servette as Basel were beaten 1–3.

Between 1936 and 1939 Saner played 43 games for Basel scoring 12 goals; 34 of these games were in the Nationalliga, 3 in the Swiss Cup and 6 were friendly games. He scored eight goals in the domestic league, one in the cup competition and the other three during the test games.

Following his time in Basel, Saner moved on and played one season for Cantonal Neuchatel. He played for Young Fellows Zürich in the 1942–43 Nationalliga season.

== Sources ==
- Rotblau: Jahrbuch Saison 2017/2018. Publisher: FC Basel Marketing AG. ISBN 978-3-7245-2189-1
- Die ersten 125 Jahre. Publisher: Josef Zindel im Friedrich Reinhardt Verlag, Basel. ISBN 978-3-7245-2305-5
- Verein "Basler Fussballarchiv" Homepage
