= Enrico Ardizzoia =

Swiss footballer (born 1917)

Personal information
- Full name: Enrico Ardizzoia
- Date of birth: June 29, 1917
- Place of birth: Switzerland
- Position: Forward

Senior career*
Years	Team	Apps	(Gls)
1934–1950	FC Basel	4	
- * Club domestic league appearances and goals

Enrico Ardizzoia (born 29 June 1917) was a Swiss footballer who played for FC Basel as a forward.

Ardizzoia joined Basel's first team in 1934. He played his domestic league debut for the club in the home game at the Landhof on 7 April 1935 as Basel drew 2–2 against Young Fellows Zürich.

Between the years 1934 and 1950 Ardizzoia played ten games for Basel scoring 41 goals. Four of these games were in the Nationalliga and six were friendly games. He scored his only goal in the test game on 17 August 1941 against Luzern.

== Sources ==
- Rotblau: Jahrbuch Saison 2017/2018. Publisher: FC Basel Marketing AG. ISBN 978-3-7245-2189-1
- Die ersten 125 Jahre. Publisher: Josef Zindel im Friedrich Reinhardt Verlag, Basel. ISBN 978-3-7245-2305-5
- Verein "Basler Fussballarchiv" Homepage
