= Heinrich Diethelm =

Swiss footballer (born 1915)

Personal information
- Full name: Heinrich Diethelm
- Date of birth: 23. July 1915
- Place of birth: Switzerland
- Date of death: 27.08.1999
- Place of death: Basel
- Position: Midfielder

Senior career*
Years	Team	Apps	(Gls)
1934–1939	FC Basel	19	(3)
- * Club domestic league appearances and goals

Heinrich Diethelm (born 23.07.1915; date of death 27.08.1999) was a Swiss footballer who played for FC Basel in the 1930s. He played as forward.

Diethelm joined Basel's first team in 1934. He played his domestic league debut for the club in the home game at the Landhof on 31 March 1935 against Biel-Bienne. He scored his first goal for them in the same game as Basel won 3–2 and it was the match winning goal.

Between the years 1934 and 1939 Diethelm played a total of 26 games for Basel scoring a total of five goals. 19 of these games were in the Nationalliga and seven were friendly games. He scored three goals in the domestic league and the other two were scored during the test games.

== Sources ==
- Rotblau: Jahrbuch Saison 2017/2018. Publisher: FC Basel Marketing AG. ISBN 978-3-7245-2189-1
- Die ersten 125 Jahre. Publisher: Josef Zindel im Friedrich Reinhardt Verlag, Basel. ISBN 978-3-7245-2305-5
- Verein "Basler Fussballarchiv" Homepage
