= Caspar Monigatti =

Swiss footballer (born 1913)

Personal information
- Full name: Caspar Monigatti
- Date of birth: 1913
- Place of birth: Switzerland
- Position: Midfielder

Senior career*
Years	Team	Apps	(Gls)
1934–1938	FC Basel	52	(0)
- * Club domestic league appearances and goals

Caspar Monigatti (born 1913; date of death unknown) was a Swiss footballer who played for FC Basel. He played as midfielder.

Monigatti joined Basel's first team in 1934. He played his domestic league debut for the club in the away game on 25 November 1934 as Basel won 2–1 against Biel-Bienne.

Between the years 1934 and 1938 Monigatti played a total of 73 games for Basel scoring one goal. 52 of these games were in the Nationalliga, six in the Swiss Cup and 15 were friendly games. He scored his only goal for his club in a test match on 13 March 1938 away from home against St. Gallen as Basel suffered a 2–3 defeat.

== Sources ==
- Rotblau: Jahrbuch Saison 2017/2018. Publisher: FC Basel Marketing AG. ISBN 978-3-7245-2189-1
- Die ersten 125 Jahre. Publisher: Josef Zindel im Friedrich Reinhardt Verlag, Basel. ISBN 978-3-7245-2305-5
- Verein "Basler Fussballarchiv" Homepage
