= Robert Büchi =

Swiss footballer (born 1910)

Personal information
- Full name: Robert Büchi
- Date of birth: 11 January 1910
- Place of birth: Switzerland
- Position: Defender

Senior career*
Years	Team	Apps	(Gls)
–1933	St. Gallen		
1933–1939	FC Basel	72	(1)
- * Club domestic league appearances and goals

Robert Büchi (born 1910) was a Swiss footballer who played for St. Gallen and FC Basel during the 1930s. He played as defender

Until 1933 Büchi played for St. Gallen. He joined Basel's first team during their 1932–33 season. He played his domestic league debut for the club in the home game at the Landhof on 10 September 1933 as Basel won 3–0 against La Chaux-de-Fonds. He scored his first and only league goal for his club on 13 September 1936 in the away game against Nordstern Basel as Basel won 3–1.

Between the years 1933 and 1939 Büchi played a total of 99 games for Basel scoring that one goal. 72 of these games were in the Nationalliga, six in the Swiss Cup and 21 were friendly games.

== Sources ==
- Rotblau: Jahrbuch Saison 2017/2018. Publisher: FC Basel Marketing AG. ISBN 978-3-7245-2189-1
- Die ersten 125 Jahre. Publisher: Josef Zindel im Friedrich Reinhardt Verlag, Basel. ISBN 978-3-7245-2305-5
- Verein "Basler Fussballarchiv" Homepage
