= Eugène de Kalbermatten =

Swiss footballer (1914-1983)

Personal information
- Full name: Eugène de Kalbermatten
- Date of birth: 1914
- Place of birth: Switzerland
- Date of death: 1983 (aged 68–69)
- Position: Goalkeeper

Senior career*
| Years | Team | Apps | (Gls) |
| until 1935 | FC Sion | | |
| 1935–1939 | FC Basel | 66 | (0) |
| 1939–1947 | Cantonal Neuchatel | 72 | (1) |
- * Club domestic league appearances and goals

Eugène de Kalbermatten (1914–1983) was a Swiss footballer who played for FC Sion, FC Basel and Cantonal Neuchatel in the 1930s and 1940s. He played as a goalkeeper.

Coming from Sion de Kalbermatten joined Basel's first team in 1935. He played his domestic league debut for his new club in the away game on 8 December 1935 as Basel played a 1–1 draw against Lugano.

De Kalbermatten played four years for Basel. He was the regular goalkeeper during his first three years at the club. In the season 1938/39 the team suffered relegation to the 1 Liga, but during this season de Kalbermatten played only three league matches and two cup games. Therefore, to gain more playing experience he moved on to Cantonal Neuchatel. Between the years 1935 and 1939 de Kalbermatten played a total of 90 games for Basel. 66 of these games were in the Nationalliga, six in the Swiss Cup and 18 were friendly games.

After his four seasons with Basel, de Kalbermatten moved on to Cantonal Neuchatel. He stayed here for eight seasons in which he played 72 league games before ending his active football.

== Sources ==
- Rotblau: Jahrbuch Saison 2017/2018. Publisher: FC Basel Marketing AG. ISBN 978-3-7245-2189-1
- Die ersten 125 Jahre. Publisher: Josef Zindel im Friedrich Reinhardt Verlag, Basel. ISBN 978-3-7245-2305-5
- Verein "Basler Fussballarchiv" Homepage
