= Josef Artimovicz =

Austrian footballer

Personal information
- Full name: Josef Artimovicz
- Date of birth: 7 January 1909
- Place of birth: Vienna, Austria
- Date of death: 11 April 1988 (aged 79)
- Position: Forward

Senior career*
Years	Team	Apps	(Gls)
- ASV Hertha Wien
- First Vienna FC
- Favoritner SC
1934–1935	Young Boys	16	(10)
1935–1937	FC Basel	26	(14)
1936–1938	Grasshopper Club	14	(7)
1938–1946	Grenchen	124	(33)
- * Club domestic league appearances and goals

Josef Artimovicz (7 January 1909 – 11 April 1988) was an Austrian footballer who played in the second half of the 1930s and in the 1940s. He played as a forward.

Born in Vienna, Artimovicz played for ASV Hertha Wien, First Vienna FC and Favoritner SC in the Austrian capital, before he joined Young Boys in Switzerland. He played one season for the Young Boys and in his 16 games he scored ten goals.

Artimovicz joined FC Basel in 1935. After two test games, against local club FC Birsfelden and the French team FC Mulhouse (in both games he scored a goal) he played his domestic league debut for Basel in the away game against St. Gallen on 25 August 1935. Although he scored his first league goal for his new club in this game, it did not save the team from being defeated by two goals to three. In his one-and-a-half years playing for Basel, Artimovicz played 39 games and scored 22 goals; 26 of the games were in the Nationalliga, 2 in the Swiss Cup and 11 were friendly games. He scored 14 goals in the domestic league and the other 8 during the test games. Artimovicz was the club's top league goal scorer in the 1935/36 Nationalliga season.

During the season 1936–37 Artimovicz moved on to play for Grasshopper Club Zürich and he stayed for a second campaign. In 1938 Artimovicz moved on to Grenchen where he played for eight years. In the 1938–39 Nationalliga season Artimovicz was the domestic league top goal scorer with 15 goals.

== Sources ==
- Rotblau: Jahrbuch Saison 2017/2018. Publisher: FC Basel Marketing AG. ISBN 978-3-7245-2189-1
- Die ersten 125 Jahre. Publisher: Josef Zindel im Friedrich Reinhardt Verlag, Basel. ISBN 978-3-7245-2305-5
- Verein "Basler Fussballarchiv" Homepage
