= Fernand Jaccard =

Swiss footballer and manager (1907–2008)

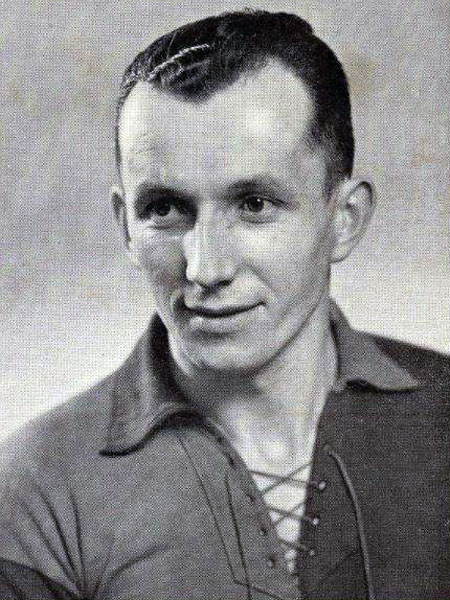
- Fernand Jaccard

Personal information
- Full name: Fernand Alfred Jaccard
- Date of birth: 8 October 1907
- Place of birth: La Chaux-de-Fonds, Switzerland
- Date of death: 15 April 2008 (aged 100)
- Place of death: Lutry, Switzerland
- Position: Midfielder

Youth career
- Étoile-Sporting

Senior career*
Years	Team	Apps	(Gls)
1924–1926	Étoile-Sporting		
1926–1934	CS La Tour de Peilz		
1934–1935	FC Montreux-Sports		
1935–1939	FC Basel	62	(4)
1939–1943	FC Locarno		
1943–1945	Servette FC		

International career
1934–1936	Switzerland	12	(0)

Managerial career
- 1937–1939: FC Basel
- 1939–1943: FC Locarno
- 1943–1948: Servette FC
- 1948–1952: Cantonal Neuchâtel FC
- 1952–1955: FC Chiasso
- 1955–1957: FC Lausanne-Sport
- * Club domestic league appearances and goals

Fernand Alfred Jaccard (8 October 1907 – 15 April 2008) was a Swiss footballer and manager. He played as midfielder. He was born in La Chaux-de-Fonds and died in Lutry.

== Playing career ==
Jaccard played his youth football with Étoile-Sporting and advanced to their first team in 1924. He stayed with Étoile-Sporting, who were playing in the Swiss Serie A, for two seasons. He then moved on to lower tier CS La Tour de Peilz and stayed there for nine seasons. Jaccard was called up to the Swiss national team in the 1933–34 season and played in the 1934 FIFA World Cup. After returning from Italy he was surprised by the fact that the club had transferred him to FC Montreux-Sports without him being involved or even knowing about it. Jaccard then played this one season for Montreux-Sports and at the end of the season he forced a transfer to Basel.

Jaccard joined Basel's first team, with German trainer Alwin Riemke, in their 1935–36 season. Jaccard played his domestic league debut for his new club in the away game on 22 December 1935 as Basel played against Young Boys. He scored his first goal for Basel on 29 March 1936 in the away game against Young Fellows Zürich, where his team was beaten 2–4.

In Basel's 1936–37 season Austrian trainer Heinz Körner took over as team manager. Körner was the tenth professional team manager/trainer in Basel's history, and their tenth foreign trainer, but he left during the season. After that Jaccard took over as player-manager. Jaccard was the club's first professional Swiss trainer. Only four consecutive victories towards the end of the campaign lifted the team to finish in joint second-last position in the league table. Because La Chaux-de-Fonds and Basel both had 20 points, they had to compete in a play-off against relegation. This play-off ended in a draw after extra time and so a replay was required. The replay was played in the Stadion Neufeld in Bern on 20 June 1937 and ended in a 1–0 victory for Basel, and so they prevented relegation.

The following season Jaccard led his team to finish in fourth position in the league table. Jaccard himself played only in 10 of the 22 games and 9 of these were in the first half of the season. Jaccard and the team finished the 1938/39 season in last position in the table and were relegated to the 1 Liga. Jaccard then left the club and joined FC Locarno. Between the years 1935 and 1939 Jaccard played a total of 79 games for Basel scoring a total of six goals. 62 of these games were in the Swiss Serie A, six in the Swiss Cup and 11 were friendly games. He scored four goal in the domestic league and the other two were scored during the test games.

== Trainer/Manager career ==
After four seasons with FC Locarno Jaccard moved on and signed for Servette FC. During his first two seasons with Servette Jaccard worked as player-manager, playing at least one game in each season. In the 1945/46 season Jaccard and his team won the Swiss championship. He stayed with Servette until the summer of 1948.

For the 1948/49 season Jaccard was appointed manager of Cantonal Neuchatel in the Nationalliga B, the second highest tier of Swiss football at that time. In their first season they finished the league in 5th position. A year later, 1949/50, they were division champions winning 19 of the 26 league games, suffering just two defeats. Jaccard had three top goal scorers in his team, Traugott Oberer scored 21 goals, André Facchinetti netted 19 times and Numa Monnard scored 10. Cantonal suffered relegation in the 1950–51 Nationalliga A season, but Jaccard remained with the club.

One year later, however, Jaccard left and became manager of Chiasso. He remained their boss for three years, before moving to Lausanne-Sport in the summer of 1955. Two years later, Jaccard retired from football. During his time in La Tour de Peilz, Jaccard had worked in a shoe shop. During his time as Servette manager, after World War II, he opened his own shoe store, which he ran as manager even beyond his retirement age.

== Titles and honours ==
Servette as manager

- Swiss National Champion: 1945–46

== Sources ==
- Rotblau: Jahrbuch Saison 2017/2018. Publisher: FC Basel Marketing AG. ISBN 978-3-7245-2189-1
- Die ersten 125 Jahre. Publisher: Josef Zindel im Friedrich Reinhardt Verlag, Basel. ISBN 978-3-7245-2305-5
- Verein "Basler Fussballarchiv" Homepage
