= 1936–37 Swiss Cup =

Tournament details
- Country: Switzerland

Final positions
- Champions: Grasshopper Club
- Runners-up: Lausanne-Sport

The 1936–37 Swiss Cup was the 12th edition of Switzerland's football cup competition, organised annually since the 1925–26 season by the Swiss Football Association.

== Overview ==
This season's cup competition began with four preliminary rounds. Two of which were played during the last two week-ends of August and the other two played in September. The first principal round was played at the beginning of October. The competition was to be completed on Easter Monday, 29 March 1937, with the final, which, this year was held in the country's capital in Bern, at the Stadion Neufeld.

The preliminary rounds were held for the lower league teams that were not qualified for the main rounds. The 24 clubs from this season's 1. Liga and the 13 clubs from the 1936–37 Nationalliga joined the competition in the first principal round, which was played on Sunday 4 October.

The matches were played in a knockout format. In the event of a draw after 90 minutes, the match went into extra time. In the event of a draw at the end of extra time, if agreed between the clubs, a replay was foreseen and this was played on the visiting team's pitch. If the replay ended in a draw after extra time, or if a replay had not been agreed, a toss of a coin would establish the team that qualified for the next round.

== Preliminary rounds ==
The lower league teams that had not qualified for the competition competed here in four preliminary rounds. Reserve teams were not admitted to the competition. The aim of this preliminary stage was to reduce the number of lower league teams to 27 before the first main round. The draw respected local regionalities. The first two preliminary rounds were played at the end of August in advance of the lower leagues regional season.

=== First preliminary round ===
Team 1	Score	Team 2
16 August 1936
Central Fribourg	9–3	Vallorbe-Sports
Stade Lausanne	1–2	ES Malley
Stade Nyonnais	6–1	FC Vignoble
USI Dopolavoro Genève	5–3	Martigny-Sports

- All other results are unknown.

=== Second preliminary round ===
Team 1	Score	Team 2
23 August 1936
Bulle	0–3	CS La Tour-de-Peilz
FC Fleurier	2–1	Stade Nyonnais
Étoile-Sporting	2–1	ES Malley
Racing Club Lausanne	3–1	Sion
USI Dopolavoro Genève	1–1 (a.e.t.)	FC Stade Payerne
FC Forward Morges	3–3 (a.e.t.)	FC Chippis
SC Balerna	2–1	US Pro Daro
GC Luganesi	2–1	FC Melide
Saint-Imier-Sports	1–2	FC Gloria (Le Locle)
Etoile Carouge	4–1	FC Sainte-Croix
FC Richemond (FR)	3–1	FC La Neuveville
CA Genève	2–1	FC Gardy-Jonction
Chênois	FF; Awd 3–0	FC Le Sentier
FC Xamax (Neuchâtel)	2–1	Central Fribourg
Sylva-Sports (La Chaux-de-Fonds)	0–3	FC Sierre
30 August 1936
Chur	4–3	FC Weinfelden
FC Töss (Winterthur)	7–1	Uster
SV Seebach (Zürich)	3–2	FC Neuhausen
FC Fortuna (SG)	3–5	FC Phönix (Winterthur)
FC Helvetia Bern	1–3	FC Länggasse (Bern)
FC Langnau am Albis (ZH)	4–2	Thun
FC Langenthal	0–3	FC Viktoria Bern
Köniz	3–0	Burgdorf
Minerva Bern	4–1	FC Lerchenfeld (Thun)
FC Aurore Bienne	4–3 (a.e.t.)	FC Nidau
Lengnau	6–2	FC Bözingen 34
FC Luterbach	2–5	FC Gerlafingen
Fulgor Grenchen	FF; Awd 3–0	FC Madretsch (Biel)
FC Biberist	2–4 (a.e.t.)	US Bienne-Boujean
Dornach	1–5	FC Breite (Basel)
SC Kleinhüningen	0–6	Black Stars
FC Birsfelden	0–2	Moutier
FC Sissach	6–1	Sportfreunde Basel
FC Liestal	2–1	US Bottechia (BS)
Delémont	2–8	Zofingen
Olympia Basel	4–3	FC Münchenstein
Old Boys	3–1	Helvetik Basel
6 September 1936
Ballspielclub Zürich	2–1	Baden
Wohlen	4–0	FC Langnau am Albis (ZH)

- Note to match Chênois–Le Sentier: Le Sentier declaied forfeit and the match was awarded as 3–0 victory for Chênois.
- Note to match Fulgor–Madretsch: FC Madretsch declaied forfeit and the match was awarded as 3–0 victory for Fulgor Grenchen.

Replays

Team 1	Score	Team 2
30 August 1936
FC Stade Payerne	FF; Awd 0–3	USI Dopolavoro Genève
FC Chippis	FF; Awd 0–3	FC Forward Morges

- Note to match Payerne–Dopolavoro: Payerne declaied forfeit and the match was awarded as 3–0 victory for USI Dopolavoro Genève.
- Note to match Chippis–Morges: Chippis declaied forfeit and the match was awarded as 3–0 victory for FC Forward Morges.

=== Third preliminary round ===
Team 1	Score	Team 2
30 August 1936
GC Luganesi	5–0	SC Balerna
13 September 1936
USI Dopolavoro Genève	0–1	FC Forward Morges
Racing Club Lausanne	1–5	Etoile Carouge
FC Gloria (Le Locle)	4–2 (a.e.t.)	FC Sierre
CA Genève	0–1	Chênois
FC Fleurier	4–3	Espérance Genève
CS La Tour-de-Peilz	7–3	Étoile-Sporting
FC Richemond (FR)	3–2	FC Xamax (Neuchâtel)
SC Zug	5–1	FC Rapperswil
FC Thalwil	2–3	Red Star
FC Adliswil	6–1	FC Wiedikon
FC Küsnacht (ZH)	1–2	FC Diana (Zürich)
FC Horgen	5–3	FC Buchs (AG)
Ballspielclub Zürich	5–2	FC Lachen
SV Höngg	0–1	FC Industrie
Wohlen	5–0	FC Unterfelden
Kickers Luzern	4–2	FC Dietikon
FC Zug	4–1	FC Wipkingen
FC Wädenswil	3–1	FC Suhr
FC Muhen	3–0	Kanton Uri
FC Viktoria Bern	3–1	SC Derendigen
FC Sissach	2–5	Zofingen

=== Fourth preliminary round ===
Team 1	Score	Team 2
20 September 1936
Black Stars	0–1	Olympia Basel
FC Liestal	0–1	Old Boys
FC Breite (Basel)	1–4	Moutier
27 September 1936
Wohlen	6–1	FC Diana (Zürich
Ballspielclub Zürich	6–3	FC Muhen
FC Wädenswil	5–3	FC Zug
Fulgor Grenchen	1–3	Lengnau
FC Länggasse (Bern)	2–7	Köniz
FC Aurore Bienne	1–2	FC Gerlafingen
FC Industrie (ZH)	FF; Awd 3–0 *	FC Horgen
FC Langnau am Albis (ZH)	FF; Awd 3–0 *	Minerva Bern
4 October 1936
Kickers Luzern	4–2	SC Zug
Red Star	4–1	FC Adliswil

- Note to match FC Industrie–FC Horgen: Horgen declaied forfeit and the match was awarded as 3–0 victory for FC Industrie.
- Note to match Langnau am Albis–Minerva: Minerva declaied forfeit and the match was awarded as 3–0 victory for Langnau am Albis.

== First principal round ==
The 13 clubs from the 1936–37 Nationalliga and the 24 clubs from this season's 1. Liga joined the competition in the first principal round.

=== Summary ===
Team 1	Score	Team 2
4 October 1936
FC Aurore Bienne	3–1	Moutier
Servette	6–0	FC Forward Morges
Bern	0–3	Young Boys
Zofingen	2–0	GC Luganesi
FC Fleurier	0–8	Lausanne-Sport
FC Langnau am Albis (ZH)	0–3	Fribourg
Richemond-Daillettes (FR)	4–3	CS La Tour-de-Peilz
Monthey	3–0	Chênois
SV Seebach (ZH)	0–10	Grasshopper Club
Chiasso	1–1 (a.e.t.)	Ballspielclub Zürich
Young Fellows	4–0	Kreuzlingen
Bellinzona	1–2	FC Industrie (ZH)
Locarno	4–1	Nordstern
Brühl	1–2 (a.e.t.)	Blue Stars
FC Phönix (Winterthur)	0–7	Juventus Zürich
FC Töss (Winterthur)	0–1	Zürich
St. Gallen	1–2	FC Schaffhausen
FC Oerlikon (ZH)	2–3	Winterthur
Lengnau	0–2	Old Boys
FC Länggasse (Bern)	1–5	FC Olten
Solothurn	1–4	Aarau
Basel	1–3	Concordia Basel
Biel-Bienne	5–0	FC Viktoria Bern
Luzern	4–0	Wohlen
SC Olympia Basel	6–0	FC Wädenswil
Grenchen	2–1	FC Porrentruy
Vevey Sports	1–1 (a.e.t.)	La Chaux-de-Fonds
Cantonal Neuchâtel	1–0	Concordia Yverdon
Urania Genève Sport	1–0	Montreux-Sports
FC Gloria (Le Locle)	1–1 (a.e.t.)	Etoile Carouge
25 October 1936
Lugano	7–0	Kickers Luzern
25 October 1936
Chur	1–0	Red Star

Replays

Team 1	Score	Team 2
25 October 1936
Ballspielclub Zürich	0–2	Chiasso
La Chaux-de-Fonds	2–1	Vevey Sports
Etoile Carouge	1–0	FC Gloria (Le Locle)

=== Matches ===
4 October 1936

Servette	6–0	FC Forward Morges
Nývlt (1:0); Belli (2:0); Walaschek (3:0); Walaschek (4:0); Billeter (5:0); Kwasz (6:0)	Servette summary

Stade des Charmilles, Geneva
- Forward Morges played the 1936/37 season in the 2. Liga (third tier), Sevette in the Nationalliga.

4 October 1936

FC Töss (Winterthur)	0–1	Zürich
	FCZ summary	85' (0:1) Bolli

Nägelsee, Winterthur
Attendance: 800
Referee: (Switzerland) Neumann (Basel)
- FC Töss played the 1936/37 season in the 2. Liga (third tier), Zürich in the 1. Liga (second tier).

4 October 1936

Solothurn	1–4	Aarau
Goal	FCA summary	Goal

Stadion FC Solothurn, Solothurn
- Solothurn and Aarau both played the 1936/37 season in the 1. Liga (second tier).

4 October 1936
15:00

Basel	1–3	Concordia Basel
Hummel 14' (1:0)	FCB summary	25' (1:1) Kult; 75' (1:2) Vonthron; 81' (1:3) Schill

Landhof, Basel
Attendance: 3,500
Referee: (Switzerland) Ferdinand Allemann (Biel/Bienne)
- Basel played the 1936/37 season in the Nationalliga (top-tier), Concordia in the 1. Liga (second tier).

== Round 2 ==
=== Summary ===
Team 1	Score	Team 2
1 November 1936
FC Aurore Bienne	2–4	Servette
Young Boys	5–1	Zofingen
Lausanne-Sport	3–1	Fribourg
Grasshopper Club	10–0	Chiasso
Young Fellows	4–0	FC Industrie (ZH)
Chur	2–3	Locarno
Blue Stars	1–5	Lugano
Juventus Zürich	3–4 (a.e.t.)	Zürich
FC Schaffhausen	2–1	Winterthur
Old Boys	6–0	FC Olten
Aarau	6–1	Concordia Basel
Biel-Bienne	4–3	Luzern
SC Olympia Basel	0–4	Grenchen
Urania Genève Sport	4–1	Etoile Carouge
Monthey	ppd	Richemond-Daillettes (FR)
La Chaux-de-Fonds	3–3 (a.e.t.)	Cantonal Neuchâtel

Replays

Team 1	Score	Team 2
8 November 1936
Richemond-Daillettes (FR)	4–6	Monthey
6 December 1936
Cantonal Neuchâtel	1–0	La Chaux-de-Fonds

=== Matches ===
1 November 1936

FC Aurore Bienne	2–4	Servette
Mottino 41' (1:2); Bichsel 69' (2:3)	Servette summary	26' (0:1) Nývlt; 31' (0:2) Walaschek; 60' (1:3) Buchoux; 71' (2:4) G. Aeby

Tilleul-Linde, Biel/Bienne
- Aurore Bienne played the 1936/37 season in the 2. Liga (third tier).

1 November 1936

Young Boys	5–1	Zofingen
Künzi 4' (1:0); P. Aebi 13' (2:0); P. Aebi 28' (3:0); P. Aebi 36' (4:0); Künzi 52' (5:0)	YB summary	60' (5:1) Mann

Wankdorf Stadium, Bern
- Zofingen played the 1936/37 season in the 2. Liga (third tier).

1 November 1936

Juventus Zürich	3–4 (a.e.t.)	Zürich
Gianola (1:2); Gianola (2:2); Regamey (3:2)	FCZ summary	(0:1) Mathier (0:2) Bolli (3:3) Busenhart; 112' (3:4) Busenhart

Förrlibuck, Zürich
Attendance: 300
Referee: (Switzerland) Walter Jordan (Basel)
- Juventus and Zürich both played the 1936/37 season in the 1. Liga (second tier).

1 November 1936

Aarau	6–1	Concordia Basel
Volentik (1:0); Volentik (2:0); Fischer (3:0); Conus (4:0); Conus (5:0) ? (6:0)	FCA summary	90' (6:1) Vonthron

Stadion Brügglifeld, Aarau
- Aarau and Concordia both played the 1936/37 season in the 1. Liga (second tier).

== Round 3 ==
=== Summary ===
Team 1	Score	Team 2
6 December 1936
Servette	3–1	Young Boys
Monthey	0–1	Lausanne-Sport
Young Fellows	2–3	Grasshopper Club
Lugano	3–2	Locarno
FC Schaffhausen	1–2	Zürich
Old Boys	2–1	Aarau
Biel-Bienne	2–1	Grenchen
13 December 1936
Urania Genève Sport	0–1	La Chaux-de-Fonds

=== Matches ===
6 December 1936

Servette	3–1	Young Boys
Walaschek 6' (1:0); Nývlt 27' (2:0); G. Aeby 30' (3:0)	Servette summary	55' (3:1) F. Lehmann

Stade des Charmilles, Geneva
- Both teams played the 1936/37 season in the Nationalliga.

6 December 1936

Young Fellows	2–3	Grasshopper Club
Ciseri 17' (1:0); Frigerio 55' (2:1)	Summary	30' (1:1) Max Abegglen; 74' (2:2) Vita; 80' (2:3) Vita

Förrlibuck, Zürich
- Both teams played the 1936/37 season in the Nationalliga.

6 December 1936

FC Schaffhausen	1–2	Zürich
Lüthi (1:0)	FCZ summary	37' (1:1) Schneiter; 46' (1:2) Schneiter

Sportplatz Schützenhaus, Schaffhausen
Attendance: 700
- FC Schaffhausen and Zürich both played the 1936/37 season in the 1. Liga (second tier).

6 December 1936

Old Boys	2–1	Aarau
Hediger; Planicek	FCA summary	Fischer

Stadion Schützenmatte, Basel
- Old Boys played the 1936/37 season in the 2. Liga (third tier), Aarau in the 1. Liga (second tier).

== Quarter-finals ==
=== Summary ===
Team 1	Score	Team 2
7 February 1937
Old Boys	1–10	Grasshopper Club
Servette	2–1	Lugano
Lausanne-Sport	8–2	La Chaux-de-Fonds
Biel-Bienne	2–0	Zürich

=== Matches ===
7 February 1937

Old Boys	1–10	Grasshopper Club
Hediger 57' (pen.)	Summary	12' (0:1) Rupf; 20' (0:2) Rupf (0:3) Bickel (0:4) Bickel; 40' (0:5) Vita; 48' (o.g.) Stoll; 52' (0:7) Vita; 62' (1:8) Rupf (1:9) Max Abegglen (1:10) Wagner

Stadion Schützenmatte, Basel
- Old Boys played the 1936/37 season in the 2. Liga (third tier), GC in the Nationalliga (top-tier).

7 February 1937

Servette	2–1	Lugano
Grosz 61' (1:1); Belli 66' (2:1)	Servette summary	18' (0:1) Grassi

- Both teams played the season in the Nationalliga (top-tier).

7 February 1937

Lausanne-Sport	8–2	La Chaux-de-Fonds
2x Spagnoli; 2x Becic; 2x Jäggi; 2x Adolf Stelzer	Summary	Bösch; Tschirren

Pontaise, Lausanne
- Both teams played the season in the Nationalliga (top-tier).

7 February 1937

Biel-Bienne	2–0	Zürich
Chiesi 41' (1:0); Chiesi 86' (2:0)	FCZ summary

Stadion Gurzelen, Biel/Bienne
Attendance: 2,200
Referee: (Switzerland) Felix Herren (Basel)
- Biel-Bienne played the 1936/37 season in the Nationalliga (top-tier), Zürich in the 1. Liga (second tier).

== Semi-finals ==
=== Summary ===
Team 1	Score	Team 2
14 March 1936
Grasshopper Club	7–3	Servette
Lausanne-Sport	5–2	Biel-Bienne

=== Matches ===
14 March 1936

Grasshopper Club	7–3 (a.e.t.)	Servette
Bickel 6' (1:0); Wagner 53' (2:2); Xam Abegglen 73' (3:2); Wagner 91' (4:3); Xam Abegglen 96' (5:3); Vita 104' (6:3); Xam Abegglen 110' (7:3)	Servette summary	25' (1:1) Aeby; 64' (1:2) Grosz; 74' (3:3) Lörtscher

Hardturm, Zürich
Attendance: 10,000
Referee: (Switzerland) Karl Wunderlin (Basel)

14 March 1936

Lausanne-Sport	5–2	Biel-Bienne
Jäggi 8' (1:1); Jäggi 24' (2:1); Spagnoli 46' (3:1); Spagnoli 53' (4:1); Becic 62' (5:1)	Summary	7' (0:1) Lüdi; 75' (5:2) Beiner

Stadion Neufeld, Bern
Attendance: 3,000
Referee: (Switzerland) Hans Wüthrich, (Bern)

== Final ==
The final was traditionally held in the capital Bern, at the former Wankdorf Stadium, on Easter Monday 1937.

=== Summary ===
Team 1	Score	Team 2
29 March 1937
Grasshopper Club	10–0	Lausanne-Sport

=== Telegram ===
29 March 1937

Grasshopper Club	10–0	Lausanne-Sport
Wagner 5' (1:0); Wagner 26' (pen.); Wagner 48' (3:0); Xam Abegglen 50' (4:0); Rupf 52' (5:0); Wagner 61' (6:0); Xam Abegglen 63' (7:0); Xam Abegglen 62' (8:0); Rupf 76' (9:0); Rupf 80' (10:0)	Fussball-Schweiz summary

Stadion Neufeld, Bern
Attendance: 15,000
Referee: (Switzerland)

Grasshopper Club won the cup and this was the club's fifth cup title to this date. Noteworthy to this result is that three players had achieved a hat-trick. Also noteworthy, is the fact that this was the second time that the final had ended with the result 10–0 and both times one of the finalists was Lausanne-Sport, only this time they had been beaten. Two years earlier they had won the cup with 10–0 against Nordstern. Some two months after the Cup final, on 6 June, the last day of the season, GC secured themselves the Swiss league championship title with their 4–0 victory against Basel. That was the second time in Grasshoppers history, that the club had achieved the double.

== Further in Swiss football ==
- 1936–37 Nationalliga
- 1936–37 Swiss 1. Liga
- 1936–37 FC Basel season
- 1936–37 BSC Young Boys season

== Sources ==
- Fussball-Schweiz
- FCB Cup games 1936–37 at fcb-achiv.ch
- Switzerland 1936–37 at RSSSF

Preceded by 1935–36	Swiss Cup seasons	Succeeded by 1937–38
