= 1944–45 BSC Young Boys season =

BSC Young Boys
1944–45 season
- Chairman: Otto Wirz
- Manager: Béla Volentik
- Stadium: Stadion Wankdorf
- Nationalliga A: 3rd
- Swiss Cup: Winners
- Biggest win: Young Boys 10-0 Etoile Sporting La Chaux-de-Fonds
- Biggest defeat: Young Boys 0-4 Servette FC

The 1944–45 season was the 45th season in the history of Berner Sport Club Young Boys. The team played their home games at Stadion Wankdorf in Bern.

== Overview ==
Young Boys achieved a third place finish in the Nationalliga and reached the finals of the Swiss Cup where they beat FC St. Gallen 2-0 on April 2, 1945. The club started strong in the Nationalliga season, keeping their non-losing streak for 16 consecutive games before losing 2-1 to FC Biel-Bienne. The team's top scorer was Eugen "Genia" Walaschek who ended the season with 11 goals.

== Players ==
- Maurice Glur
- Hans Flühmann
- Louis Gobet
- Albert Stoll
- Eugène Walaschek
- Hans Liniger
- Fritz Knecht
- Walter Streun
- Hans Trachsel
- Willy Bernhard
- José Puigventos

== Friendlies ==
Win Draw Loss

10 September 1944 Friendly	Young Boys (Switzerland)	3–1	(Switzerland) Zürich	Bern
				Stadium: Stadion Wankdorf; Attendance: 1,500; Referee: Paul von Wartburg

== Competitions ==
=== Overall record ===
Competition	First match	Last match	Starting round	Final position	Record							
Competition	First match	Last match	Starting round	Final position	Pld	W	D	L	GF	GA	GD	Win %
Nationalliga A	24 September 1944	1 July 1945	Matchday 1	3rd	26	13	8	5	37	30	+7	50.00
Swiss Cup	24 December 1944	2 April 1945	Round of 32	Winners	6	5	1	0	22	4	+18	83.33
Total					32	18	9	5	59	34	+25	56.25

Source: Competitions

=== Nationalliga A ===
==== League table ====
Pos	Team	Pld	W	D	L	GF	GA	GD	Pts	Qualification or relegation
1	Grasshopper Club	26	18	5	3	78	39	+39	41	Swiss Champions
2	Lugano	26	15	4	7	55	36	+19	34	
3	Young Boys	26	13	8	5	37	30	+7	34	Swiss Cup winners
4	Grenchen	26	13	7	6	37	29	+8	33	
5	Lausanne-Sport	26	15	2	9	58	39	+19	32	

Source: rsssf.com
Rules for classification: 1) Points; 2) Goal difference within the league, however with play-off for qualifiers;

Pos	Team	Pld	W	D	L	GF	GA	GD	Pts	Qualification or relegation
1	FC Locarno	26	17	6	3	60	26	+34	40	NLB champions and promoted to 1945–46 NLA
2	FC Bern	26	18	3	5	65	36	+29	39	Promoted to 1945–46 NLA
3	FC Aarau	26	15	4	7	67	40	+27	34	
4	CS International Genève	26	14	5	7	40	28	+12	33	
5	Urania Genève Sport	26	11	6	9	53	48	+5	28	
6	SC Derendingen	26	9	9	8	43	43	0	27	
7	FC Luzern	26	8	10	8	41	32	+9	26	
8	FC Étoile-Sporting	26	10	6	10	54	54	0	26	
9	FC Fribourg	26	9	6	11	36	42	−6	24	
10	FC Nordstern Basel	26	8	5	13	41	46	−5	21	
11	SC Brühl	26	8	5	13	40	53	−13	21	
12	SC Zug	26	6	6	14	24	38	−14	18	
13	FC Solothurn	26	4	7	15	29	61	−32	15	Relegated to 1945–46 1. Liga
14	US Pro Daro	26	4	4	18	24	70	−46	12	Relegated to 1945–46 1. Liga

Source: rsssf.com
Rules for classification: 1) Points; 2) Goal difference within the league, however with play-off for qualifiers;

==== Matches ====
24 September 1944 Round 2	Young Boys	4–4	Zürich	Bern
				Stadium: Stadion Wankdorf; Attendance: 2,500; Referee: (Switzerland) Mario Grassi

1 October 1944 Round 3	St. Gallen	0–0	Young Boys	St. Gallen
				Stadium: Espenmoos; Attendance: 1,500; Referee: (Switzerland) Armand Merlotti

8 October 1944 Round 4	Young Boys	2–2	Biel-Bienne	Bern
				Stadium: Stadion Wankdorf; Attendance: 3,000; Referee: (Switzerland) Leopold Schmidsberger

15 October 1944 Round 5	Cantonal Neuchâtel	1–3	Young Boys	Neuchâtel
				Stadium: Stade de la Maladière; Attendance: 2,800; Referee: (Switzerland) Charles Iseli

12 November 1944 Round 1	Bellinzona	0–0	Young Boys	Bellinzona
				Stadium: Campo via Stefano Franscini; Attendance: 3,000; Referee: (Switzerland) Charles Iseli

22 October 1944 Round 6	Young Boys	3–2	Servette	Bern
				Stadium: Stadion Wankdorf; Attendance: 5,000; Referee: (Switzerland) Hans Vogt

29 October 1944 Round 7	Young Boys	1–0	Lausanne-Sport	Bern
				Stadium: Stadion Wankdorf; Attendance: 5,000; Referee: (Switzerland) Alfred Schmoll

5 November 1944 Round 8	Lugano	0–0	Young Boys	Lugano
				Stadium: Campo Marzio; Attendance: 3,500; Referee: (Switzerland) Rosenbaum

19 November 1944 Round 9	Young Boys	1–0	Grasshopper Club Zürich	Bern
				Stadium: Stadion Wankdorf; Attendance: 8,000; Referee: (Switzerland) Jean Lutz

26 November 1944 Round 10	Young Fellows Zürich	1–2	Young Boys	Zürich
				Stadium: Letzigrund; Attendance: 7,000; Referee: (Switzerland) Walter Häring

10 December 1944 Round 11	Young Boys	0–0	Grenchen	Bern
				Stadium: Stadion Wankdorf; Attendance: 7,000; Referee: (Switzerland) Hans Vogt

17 December 1944 Round 12	La Chaux-de-Fonds	0–1	Young Boys	La Chaux-de-Fonds
				Stadium: Stade de la Charrière; Attendance: 2,500; Referee: (Switzerland) Rodolphe Wittwer

31 December 1944 Round 13	Young Boys	2–1	Basel	Wankdorf Stadium, Bern
14:30	Walaschek 30' (1:0); Trachsel 37' (2:0)	Summary	75' (2:1) Oberer	Attendance: 3,000; Referee: (Switzerland) Wittwer Geneva

18 March 1945 Round 14	Young Boys	3–1	Bellinzona	Bern
				Stadium: Stadion Wankdorf; Attendance: 5,000; Referee: (Switzerland) Rosenbaum

15 April 1945 Round 16	Young Boys	1–1	St. Gallen	Bern
				Stadium: Stadion Wankdorf; Attendance: 3,500; Referee: (Switzerland) Walter Häring

22 April 1945 Round 17	Biel-Bienne	2–1	Young Boys	Biel/Bienne
				Stadium: Stadion Gurzelen; Attendance: 3,200; Referee: (Switzerland) Adrien Sandoz

29 April 1945 Round 18	Young Boys	1–0	Cantonal Neuchâtel	Bern
				Stadium: Stadion Wankdorf; Attendance: 3,000; Referee: (Switzerland) Louis Tschopp

6 May 1945 Round 19	Servette	4–0	Young Boys	Geneva
				Stadium: Stade des Charmilles; Attendance: 4,500; Referee: (Switzerland) Rosenbaum

13 May 1945 Round 20	Lausanne-Sport	3–0	Young Boys	Lausanne
				Stadium: Stade de la Pontaise; Attendance: 4,000; Referee: (Switzerland) Hans Vogt

21 May 1945 Round 15	Zürich	0–3	Young Boys	Zürich
				Stadium: Letzigrund; Attendance: 2,500; Referee: (Switzerland) Jean Lutz

27 May 1945 Round 21	Young Boys	2–1	Lugano	Bern
				Stadium: Stadion Wankdorf; Attendance: 6,000; Referee: (Switzerland) Roger Rapin

3 June 1945 Round 22	Grasshopper Club Zürich	2–1	Young Boys	Zürich
				Stadium: Hardturm; Attendance: 10,000; Referee: (Switzerland) Ernst Dörflinger

10 June 1945 Round 23	Young Boys	1–0	Young Fellows Zürich	Bern
				Stadium: Stadion Wankdorf; Attendance: 3,000; Referee: (Switzerland) Mario Grassi

17 June 1945 Round 24	Grenchen	1–0	Young Boys	Grenchen
				Stadium: Stadion Brühl; Attendance: 2,000; Referee: (Switzerland) Joseph Schürch

24 June 1945 Round 25	Young Boys	1–1	La Chaux-de-Fonds	Bern
				Stadium: Stadion Wankdorf; Attendance: 2,000; Referee: (Switzerland) Rodolphe Wittwer

1 July 1945 Round 26	Basel	3–4	Young Boys	Landhof, Basel
15:30	Vonthron (1:3); Bader 80' (2:4); Vonthron (pen. 3:4)	Summary	16' (0:1) Knecht; 30' (0:2) Bernhard; 62' (0:3) Walaschek; 67' (1:4) Streun	Attendance: 5,000; Referee: (Switzerland) } DörflingerGrenchen

=== Swiss Cup ===
24 December 1944 Round of 32	Sion	2–4	Young Boys	Sion
				Stadium: Stade Tourbillon

19 February 1945 Round of 16	Young Boys	10–0	Etoile-Sporting La Chaux-de-Fonds	Bern
				Stadium: Stadion Wankdorf

26 February 1945 Quarter-finals	Grenchen	0–2	Young Boys	Grenchen
				Stadium: Stadion Brühl

11 March 1945 Semi-finals	Young Fellows Zürich	1–1 (a.e.t.)	Young Boys	Zürich
				Stadium: Letzigrund

25 March 1945 Semi-finals replay	Young Boys	0–0 (a.e.t.)	Young Fellows Zürich	Bern
				Stadium: Stadion Wankdorf

31 March 1945 Semi-finals 2nd replay	Young Fellows Zürich	2–4	Young Boys	Basel
				Stadium: Landhof

2 April 1945 Final	Young Boys	2–0 (a.e.t.)	St. Gallen	Bern
	Trachsel 97'; Walascheck 108' (pen.)			Stadium: Stadion Wankdorf
