= 1935–36 BSC Young Boys season =

BSC Young Boys
1935–36 season
- Chairman: Rudolf Roth
- Manager: Izidor Kürschner
- Stadium: Stadion Wankdorf
- Nationalliga: 6th
- Swiss Cup: Semi-finals

The 1935–36 season was the 37th season in the history of Berner Sport Club Young Boys. The team played their home games at Stadion Wankdorf in Bern, placing 6th in the Nationalliga, and being eliminated in the semi-finals of the Swiss Cup.

== Players ==
- Roger Droguet
- Achille Siegrist
- Max Horisberger
- Fritz Lehmann
- Hans Liniger
- Fritz Künzi
- Attilio Mordasini
- Louis Favre
- Vilmos Sipos
- Franjo Petrak
- Paul Aebi

== Competitions ==
Win Draw Loss

=== Overall record ===
Competition	First match	Last match	Starting round	Final position	Record							
Competition	First match	Last match	Starting round	Final position	Pld	W	D	L	GF	GA	GD	Win %
Nationalliga	25 August 1935	17 May 1936	Matchday 1	6th	26	10	6	10	38	40	−2	38.46
Swiss Cup	6 October 1935	1 March 1936	1st principal round	Semi-finals	6	4	1	1	21	8	+13	66.67
Total					32	14	7	11	59	48	+11	43.75

Source: Competitions

=== Nationalliga ===
==== League table ====
Pos	Team	Pld	W	D	L	GF	GA	GD	Pts
4	Bern	26	15	4	7	71	49	+22	34
5	Biel-Bienne	26	12	4	10	60	46	+14	28
6	Young Boys	26	10	6	10	38	40	−2	26
7	Servette	26	8	8	10	37	46	−9	24
8	Lugano	26	7	9	10	38	47	−9	23

Source: rsssf.com
Rules for classification: 1) Points; 2) Goal difference within the league, however with play-off for qualifiers;

==== Matches ====
25 August 1935 Round 1	Young Boys	3–1	Locarno	Bern
				Stadium: Stadion Wankdorf; Attendance: 3,000; Referee: (Switzerland) Felix Herren

1 September 1935 Round 2	La Chaux-de-Fonds	1–1	Young Boys	La Chaux-de-Fonds
				Stadium: Parc des Sports; Attendance: 1,800; Referee: (Switzerland) Willy Dagon

8 September 1935 Round 3	Young Boys	0–1	FC Bern	Bern
				Stadium: Stadion Wankdorf; Attendance: 7,000; Referee: (Switzerland) Karl Wunderlin

22 September 1935 Round 4	Lausanne-Sport	1–0	Young Boys	Lausanne
				Stadium: Stade olympique de la Pontaise; Attendance: 3,000; Referee: (Switzerland) Felix Herren

29 September 1935 Round 5	Young Boys	4–2	Nordstern Basel	Bern
				Stadium: Stadion Wankdorf; Attendance: 3,000; Referee: (Switzerland) Ernest Meyer

13 October 1935 Round 6	Young Fellows Zürich	3–3	Young Boys	Zürich
				Stadium: Stadion Förrlibuck; Attendance: 5,000; Referee: (Switzerland) Alfred Spengler

20 October 1935 Round 7	Young Boys	1–1	Lugano	Bern
				Stadium: Stadion Wankdorf; Attendance: 5,000; Referee: (Switzerland) Eduard Iseli

24 November 1935 Round 9	Young Boys	0–1	Aarau	Bern
				Stadium: Stadion Wankdorf; Attendance: 3,000; Referee: (Switzerland) Walter Jordan

8 December 1935 Round 10	Young Boys	4–0	Servette	Bern
				Stadium: Stadion Wankdorf; Attendance: 5,000; Referee: (Switzerland) Ferdinand Allemann

15 December 1935 Round 11	St. Gallen	5–2	Young Boys	St. Gallen
				Stadium: Espenmoos; Attendance: 1,200; Referee: (Switzerland) Eduard Iseli

22 December 1935 Round 12	Young Boys	1–0	Basel	Wankdorf Stadium, Bern
	Stegmeier (1:0)	Summary		Attendance: 2,500; Referee: (Switzerland) Spengler Olten

5 January 1936 Round 8	Biel-Bienne	0–0	Young Boys	Biel/Bienne
				Stadium: Stadion Gurzelen; Attendance: 4,000; Referee: (Switzerland) Karl Wunderlin

12 January 1936 Round 14	Locarno	0–1	Young Boys	Locarno
				Stadium: Stadio del Lido; Attendance: 800; Referee: (Switzerland) Eduard Iseli

19 January 1936 Round 15	Young Boys	3–1	La Chaux-de-Fonds	Bern
				Stadium: Stadion Wankdorf; Attendance: 4,000; Referee: (Switzerland) Alfred Spengler

26 January 1936 Round 16	FC Bern	0–1	Young Boys	Bern
				Stadium: Stadion Neufeld; Attendance: 8,000; Referee: (Switzerland) William Bangerter

9 February 1936 Round 17	Young Boys	0–1	Lausanne-Sport	Bern
				Stadium: Stadion Wankdorf; Attendance: 6,000; Referee: (Switzerland) Karl Wunderlin

16 February 1936 Round 18	Nordstern Basel	5–0	Young Boys	Basel
				Stadium: Stadion Rankhof; Attendance: 2,500; Referee: (Switzerland) William Bangerter

23 February 1936 Round 19	Young Boys	0–3	Young Fellows Zürich	Bern
				Stadium: Stadion Wankdorf; Attendance: 4,000; Referee: (Switzerland) Ernest Meyer

8 March 1936 Round 20	Lugano	2–2	Young Boys	Lugano
				Stadium: Campo Marzio; Attendance: 2,500; Referee: (Switzerland) William Bangerter

22 March 1936 Round 21	Young Boys	2–0	Biel-Bienne	Bern
				Stadium: Stadion Wankdorf; Attendance: 4,000; Referee: (Switzerland) Alfred Spengler

29 March 1936 Round 22	Aarau	3–1	Young Boys	Aarau
				Stadium: Stadion Brügglifeld; Attendance: 2,000; Referee: (Switzerland) Felix Herren

19 April 1936 Round 23	Servette	1–0	Young Boys	Geneva
				Stadium: Charmilles Stadium; Attendance: 3,500; Referee: (Switzerland) William Bangerter

26 April 1936 Round 24	Young Boys	3–1	St. Gallen	Bern
				Stadium: Stadion Wankdorf; Attendance: 2,000; Referee: (Switzerland) Paul Speidel

6 May 1936 Round 13	Grasshopper Club Zürich	2–4	Young Boys	Zürich
				Stadium: Hardturm; Attendance: 2,000; Referee: (Switzerland) Saly Rosenbaum

10 May 1936 Round 25	Basel	1–1	Young Boys	Landhof, Basel
15:00	Jaeck (1:0)	Summary	85' (1:1) Petrak	Attendance: 2,500; Referee: (Switzerland) Ferdinand Allemann Biel/Bienne

17 May 1936 Round 26	Young Boys	1–4	Grasshopper Club Zürich	Bern
				Stadium: Stadion Wankdorf; Attendance: 3,000; Referee: (Switzerland) Paul Speidel

=== Swiss Cup ===
6 October 1935 1st principal round	Lausanne-Sport	1–2	Young Boys	Lausanne
				Stadium: Stade olympique de la Pontaise

17 November 1935 Round 1	Young Boys	8–1	Sion	Bern
				Stadium: Stadion Wankdorf

1 December 1935 Round 2	FC Grenchen	0–0	Young Boys	Grenchen
				Stadium: Stadion Brühl

2 January 1936 Round 2 replay	Young Boys	5–2	FC Grenchen	Bern
				Stadium: Stadion Wankdorf

2 February 1936 Round 3	Aarau	Postponed	Young Boys	Aarau
				Stadium: Stadion Brühl

12 February 1936 Round 3 replay	Young Boys	5–0	Aarau	Bern
				Stadium: Stadion Wankdorf

1 March 1936 Semi-finals	Young Fellows Zürich	4–1	Young Boys	Zürich
				Stadium: Stadion Förrlibuck
