= 1944–45 Nationalliga A =

Swiss football season

Nationalliga A
- Season: 1944–45
- Dates: 3 September 1944 – 1 July 1945
- Champions: Grasshopper Club (13th title)
- Relegated: Basel; St. Gallen
- Matches: 182
- Goals: 602 (3.31 per match)
- Top goalscorer: Hans-Peter Friedländer (GC); 26 goals

Nationalliga B
- Season: 1944–45
- Dates: 3 September 1944 – 1 July 1945
- Champions: Locarno
- Promoted: Locarno; Bern
- Relegated: Solothurn; Pro Daro
- Matches: 182

The following is the summary of the Swiss National League in the 1944–45 football season, both Nationalliga A and Nationalliga B. This was the 49th season of top-tier and the 48th season of second-tier football in Switzerland.

== Overview ==
=== Preamble ===
In Switzerland during the second world war, sport became an integral part of the "spiritual national defense". This was a political and cultural movement that had already become increasingly important during the late 1930s. Politicians, intellectuals and media professionals had increasingly called for measures to strengthen Switzerland's basic cultural values. Since the Nationalliga games were also considered to be one of the activities that seemed important for maintaining the morale of the population, the military authorities put considerably fewer obstacles in the way of the top players as they had during the previous World War.

=== ASF/SFV ===
Therefore, it came about that the Swiss Football Association (ASF/SFV) expanded themselves. The decision of the extraordinary assembly, held on 9 October 1943 in Lugano, was to double the number of members to 28 clubs for the 1944–45 season and to initiate a new format. The Nationalliga was divided into two strength classes each with 14 teams. The previous Nationalliga became the Nationalliga A (NLA), while the Nationalliga B (NLB) was newly formed. From this moment, the 1. Liga became the third-tier of the Swiss football league system. It was also increased in size, from 25 clubs in two groups, to new three groups with 10 teams each.

=== Format ===
The teams in both NLA and in NLB played a double round-robin to decide their table positions. Two points were awarded for a win and one point was awarded for a draw. The top tier (NLA) was contested by the top 13 teams from the 1943–44 Nationalliga and the newly promoted, 1. Liga champion, AC Bellinzona. The two last placed teams in the league table at the end of the season were to be relegated.

The second-tier, the newly formed NLB, was contested by the relegated team from the NLA, FC Luzern, and the 13 best teams of the 1943–44 Swiss 1. Liga season. The top two teams would be promoted to 1945–46 Nationalliga A and the two last placed teams would be relegated to the 1945–46 Swiss 1. Liga.

== Nationalliga A ==
=== Teams, locations ===
Team	Based in	Canton	Stadium	Capacity
FC Basel	Basel	Basel-Stadt	Landhof	4,000
AC Bellinzona	Bellinzona	Ticino	Stadio Comunale Bellinzona	5,000
FC Biel-Bienne	Biel/Bienne	Bern	Stadion Gurzelen	5,500
FC Cantonal Neuchâtel	Neuchâtel	Neuchâtel	Stade de la Maladière	25,500
Grasshopper Club Zürich	Zürich	Zürich	Hardturm	20,000
FC Grenchen	Grenchen	Solothurn	Stadium Brühl	15,100
FC La Chaux-de-Fonds	La Chaux-de-Fonds	Neuchâtel	Centre Sportif de la Charrière	10,000
FC Lausanne-Sport	Lausanne	Vaud	Pontaise	30,000
FC Lugano	Lugano	Ticino	Cornaredo Stadium	6,330
Servette FC	Geneva	Geneva	Stade des Charmilles	27,000
FC St. Gallen	St. Gallen	St. Gallen	Espenmoos	11,000
BSC Young Boys	Bern	Bern	Wankdorf Stadium	56,000
FC Young Fellows	Zürich	Zürich	Utogrund	2,850
FC Zürich	Zürich	Zürich	Letzigrund	25,000

=== Final league table ===
Pos	Team	Pld	W	D	L	GF	GA	GD	Pts	Qualification or relegation
1	Grasshopper Club	26	18	5	3	78	39	+39	41	Swiss Champions
2	Lugano	26	15	4	7	55	36	+19	34	
3	Young Boys	26	13	8	5	37	30	+7	34	Swiss Cup winners
4	Grenchen	26	13	7	6	37	29	+8	33	
5	Lausanne-Sport	26	15	2	9	58	39	+19	32	
6	Cantonal Neuchâtel	26	10	9	7	36	29	+7	29	
7	Young Fellows Zürich	26	10	5	11	35	43	−8	25	
8	La Chaux-de-Fonds	26	8	7	11	42	50	−8	23	
9	Servette	26	8	5	13	43	47	−4	21	
10	Bellinzona	26	5	11	10	24	32	−8	21	
11	FC Zürich	26	6	8	12	45	57	−12	20	
12	Biel-Bienne	26	5	10	11	39	56	−17	20	
13	Basel	26	6	6	14	45	59	−14	18	Relegated to 1945–46 NLB
14	St. Gallen	26	3	7	16	28	56	−28	13	Relegated to 1945–46 NLB

Source: rsssf.com
Rules for classification: 1) Points; 2) Goal difference within the league, however with play-off for qualifiers;

=== Results ===
Home \ Away	BAS	BEL	BB	CAN	CDF	GCZ	GRE	LS	LUG	SER	STG	YB	YFZ	ZÜR
Basel		2–0	3–1	0–4	2–1	3–3	0–2	2–3	4–4	3–1	3–0	3–4	3–0	3–3
Bellinzona	0–0		2–2	1–0	3–0	0–0	3–1	2–3	1–2	0–0	2–0	0–0	2–0	0–0
Biel-Bienne	2–2	1–1		0–0	2–0	3–3	0–1	2–1	0–5	2–0	1–1	2–1	1–1	3–3
Cantonal Neuchâtel	3–0	1–0	3–2		0–0	1–1	0–0	2–0	1–0	2–3	4–2	1–3	1–1	2–1
La Chaux-de-Fonds	3–1	0–0	4–0	4–1		0–3	2–2	4–7	3–1	3–1	3–2	0–1	4–1	0–0
Grasshopper Club	6–4	3–0	6–3	1–1	4–1		5–1	1–2	4–3	6–3	6–0	2–1	2–1	4–1
Grenchen	1–0	3–1	3–0	1–1	0–0	1–4		1–1	0–0	4–2	2–0	1–0	0–1	4–3
Lausanne-Sports	2–0	1–1	2–1	1–3	4–1	4–0	2–1		2–3	4–3	2–0	3–0	1–0	5–0
Lugano	4–3	3–1	3–0	2–0	4–0	1–2	2–0	4–2		1–1	1–0	0–0	2–4	2–0
Servette	2–0	2–0	0–2	1–1	3–1	1–2	0–1	1–0	2–3		1–1	4–0	3–0	1–1
St. Gallen	2–2	3–3	1–0	0–2	2–5	2–3	0–2	1–3	1–2	4–2		0–0	1–1	1–2
Young Boys	2–1	3–1	2–2	1–0	1–1	1–0	0–0	1–0	2–1	3–2	1–1		1–0	4–4
Young Fellows	2–0	0–0	5–4	3–1	2–2	0–3	0–2	1–0	2–0	2–1	2–1	1–2		1–3
Zürich	4–1	2–0	3–3	1–1	3–0	1–4	2–3	3–2	1–2	1–3	1–2	0–3	2–3	

Source: rsssf.com
Legend: Blue = home team win; Yellow = draw; Red = away team win.

=== Topscorers ===
Rank	Player	Nat.	Goals	Club
1.	Hans-Peter Friedländer	(Switzerland)	26	Grasshopper Club
2.	Alfred Bickel	(Switzerland)	18	Grasshopper Club
3.	Numa Monnard	(Switzerland)	16	Lausanne-Sport
4.	Domenico Gallo	(Switzerland)	13	Lugano
4.	Roberto Bergamini	(Switzerland)	13	Lugano
6.	Georges Aeby	(Switzerland)	12	Lausanne-Sport
6.	Roger Courtois	(Switzerland)	12	Lausanne-Sport
6.	Giovanni Conte	(Switzerland)	12	Zürich
9.	Lauro Amadò	(Switzerland)	11	Grasshopper Club
9.	Mario Fornara	(Switzerland)	11	Lugano
9.	Eugen Walaschek	(Switzerland)	11	Young Boys
9.	Walter Bosshard	(Switzerland)	11	Zürich
9.	René Bader	(Switzerland)	11	Basel

== Nationalliga B ==
=== Teams, locations ===
Team	Based in	Canton	Stadium	Capacity
FC Aarau	Aarau	Aargau	Stadion Brügglifeld	9,240
FC Bern	Bern	Bern	Stadion Neufeld	14,000
SC Brühl	St. Gallen	St. Gallen	Paul-Grüninger-Stadion	4,200
SC Derendingen	Derendingen	Solothurn	Heidenegg	1,500
FC Étoile-Sporting	La Chaux-de-Fonds	Neuchâtel	Les Foulets / Terrain des Eplatures	1,000 / 500
FC Fribourg	Fribourg	Fribourg	Stade Universitaire	9,000
CS International Genève	Geneva	Geneva		
FC Locarno	Locarno	Ticino	Stadio comunale Lido	5,000
FC Luzern	Lucerne	Lucerne	Stadion Allmend	25,000
FC Nordstern Basel	Basel	Basel-Stadt	Rankhof	7,600
US Pro Daro	Bellinzona	Ticino	Campo Geretta / Stadio Comunale Bellinzona	500 / 5,000
FC Solothurn	Solothurn	Solothurn	Stadion FC Solothurn	6,750
Urania Genève Sport	Genève	Geneva	Stade de Frontenex	4,000
SC Zug	Zug	Zug	Herti Allmend Stadion	6,000

=== Final league table ===
Pos	Team	Pld	W	D	L	GF	GA	GD	Pts	Qualification or relegation
1	FC Locarno	26	17	6	3	60	26	+34	40	NLB champions and promoted to 1945–46 NLA
2	FC Bern	26	18	3	5	65	36	+29	39	Promoted to 1945–46 NLA
3	FC Aarau	26	15	4	7	67	40	+27	34	
4	CS International Genève	26	14	5	7	40	28	+12	33	
5	Urania Genève Sport	26	11	6	9	53	48	+5	28	
6	SC Derendingen	26	9	9	8	43	43	0	27	
7	FC Luzern	26	8	10	8	41	32	+9	26	
8	FC Étoile-Sporting	26	10	6	10	54	54	0	26	
9	FC Fribourg	26	9	6	11	36	42	−6	24	
10	FC Nordstern Basel	26	8	5	13	41	46	−5	21	
11	SC Brühl	26	8	5	13	40	53	−13	21	
12	SC Zug	26	6	6	14	24	38	−14	18	
13	FC Solothurn	26	4	7	15	29	61	−32	15	Relegated to 1945–46 1. Liga
14	US Pro Daro	26	4	4	18	24	70	−46	12	Relegated to 1945–46 1. Liga

Source: rsssf.com
Rules for classification: 1) Points; 2) Goal difference within the league, however with play-off for qualifiers;

== Further in Swiss football ==
- 1944–45 Swiss Cup
- 1944–45 Swiss 1. Liga

== Sources ==
- Switzerland 1944–45 at RSSSF

Preceded by 1943–44	Nationalliga seasons in Switzerland	Succeeded by 1945–46
