= 1935–36 Swiss Cup =

Tournament details
- Country: Switzerland

Final positions
- Champions: Young Fellows
- Runners-up: Servette

The 1935–36 Swiss Cup was the 11th edition of Switzerland's football cup competition, organised annually since the 1925–26 season by the Swiss Football Association.

== Overview ==
This season's cup competition began with three preliminary rounds. These were played during the last few week-ends of August 1935. The first principal round was played at the beginning of October. The competition was to be completed on Easter Monday, 13 April 1936, with the final, which this year was held at the Förrlibuck in Zürich.

The preliminary rounds were held for the lower league teams that were not qualified for the main rounds. Reserve teams were not admitted to the competition. The 14 clubs from the 1935–36 Nationalliga and the 24 clubs from this season's 1. Liga joined the competition in the first principal round, which was played on Sunday 6 October.

The matches were played in a knockout format. In the event of a draw after 90 minutes, the match went into extra time. In the event of a draw at the end of extra time, if agreed between the clubs, a replay was foreseen and this was played on the visiting team's pitch. If the replay ended in a draw after extra time, it would require another replay. However, if a replay had not been agreed, a toss of a coin would establish the team that qualified for the next round.

== Preliminary rounds ==
The lower league teams that had not qualified for the competition, competed here in three preliminary knockout rounds. Reserve teams were not admitted to the competition. The aim of this preliminary stage was to reduce the number of lower league teams to 26 before the first main round. The draw respected local regionalities. The preliminary rounds were played during August, a few in September, but all in advance of the lower leagues regional season.

=== First preliminary round ===
Team 1	Score	Team 2
11 August 1936
US Pro Daro	7–1	GC Massagnesi
FC Wädenswil	5–1	SC Zug
SC Wipkingen	1–0	FC Muhen
Red Star	0–1	Baden
FC Brugg	1–0	FC Hakoah (ZH)
18 August 1936
FC Luterbach	2–1	FC Langenthal
Laufen	0–2	Fulgor Grenchen
FC Romanshorn	2–4	FC Fortuna (SG)
SC Balerna	2–1	Mendrisio
ASEP Saint-Imier	2–3	Étoile-Sporting
Couvet-Sports	6–3	Novelty-Sports Fleurier
FC Renens	0–2	FC Orbe
FC Le Sentier	0–10	FC Forward Morges
FC La Neuveville	3–0	FC Floria Olympic (La Chaux-de-Fonds)
Black Stars	3–2 (a.e.t.)	US Bottecchia Basel
FC Liestal	0–2 (a.e.t.)	Olympia Basel

=== Second preliminary round ===
Team 1	Score	Team 2
18 August 1935
Dornach	1–7	FC Birsfelden
Bellinzona	7–0	GC Luganesi
FC Lachen	2–1	Wohlen
FC Industrie (ZH)	2–2 (a.e.t.)	FC Suhr
FC Rapperswil	3–2	FC Brugg
FC Wiedikon	1–2	FC Diana (Zürich)
FC Zug	2–4	FC Langnau am Albis (ZH)
SV Höngg	1–2	FC Wädenswil
FC Küsnacht (ZH)	2–1	FC Adliswil
Ballspielclub Zürich	2–0	FC Buchs (AG)
FC Unterenfelden	2–4	FC Gränichen
SC Wipkingen	5–2	FC Dietikon
Kickers Luzern	3–4	Baden
FC Horgen	1–6	FC Thalwil
US Pro Daro	7–1	SC Balerna
Zähringia Bern	1–1 (a.e.t.)	FC Lerchenfeld (Thun)
25 August 1935
Thun	9–1	FC Luterbach
Sportfreunde Basel	0–2	FC Allschwil
Rasenspiele Basel	4–3	Black Stars
Fulgor Grenchen	1–7	US Bienne-Boujean
FC Tramelan	1–4	FC Tavannes
Lengnau	1–2	Moutier
Delémont	4–2	FC Reconvilier
FC Madretsch (Biel)	5–1	FC Aurore Bienne
FC Grünstern (Ipsach)	3–4	FC Nidau
SC Derendingen	1–2	FC Helvetia Bern
FC Langnau im Emmental (BE)	2–3	FC Viktoria Bern
Minerva Bern	1–4	FC Biberist
FC Breite (Basel)	1–1 (a.e.t.)	FC Helvetik (Basel)
Zofingen	5–1	FC Kleinhüningen
FC Gerlafingen	3–1	FC Lyss
Espérance Genève	1–3	Martigny-Sports
USI Dopolavoro Genève	6–1	Stade Lausanne
FC Sierre	4–2	Villeneuve-Sports
FC Orbe	1–5	CS La Tour-de-Peilz
FC Vignoble Cully	1–3	FC Chippis
Sion	6–2	Stade Nyonnais
Vallorbe-Sports	0–1	FC Gardy-Jonction
Étoile-Sporting	2–3	FC Fleurier
Richemond (FR)	0–3	FC Gloria (Le Locle)
FC Xamax (Neuchâtel)	1–2	Couvet-Sports
FC La Neuveville	0–2	Chênois
FC Forward Morges	1–1 (a.e.t.)	CA Genève
FC Stade Payerne	1–1 (a.e.t.)	Concordia Yverdon
FC Yverdon	0–5	Sylva-Sports (Le Locle)
FC Altstetten (Zürich)	4–0	SV Schaffhausen
SC Veltheim (Winterthur)	2–3	FC Buchs (SG)
Frauenfeld	2–3	Uster
FC Tössfeld (Winterthur)	1–5 *	FC Neuhausen
FC Fortuna (SG)	8–2	FC Rorschach
Arbon	FF; Awd 3–0	FC Töss (Winterthur)
1 September 1935
Olympia Basel	1–0	Old Boys

- The match Tössfeld–Neuhausen was played in Neuhausen am Rheinfall
- Note to match Arbon–Töss: Töss declaied forfeit and the match was awarded 3–0 to Arbon.

Replays

Team 1	Score	Team 2
25 August 1935
FC Suhr	2–2 (a.e.t.)	FC Industrie (ZH)
1 September 1935
FC Lerchenfeld (Thun)	4–2	Zähringia Bern
CA Genève	2–0	FC Forward Morges
Concordia Yverdon	6–1	FC Stade Payerne
8 September 1935
FC Helvetik (Basel)	2–0	FC Breite (Basel)

Second replay

Team 1	Score	Team 2
1 September 1935
FC Industrie (ZH)	3–1	FC Suhr

=== Third preliminary round ===
Team 1	Score	Team 2
25 August 1935
Bellinzona	3–1	US Pro Daro
FC Birsfelden	5–2	SV Sissach
1 September 1935
Couvet-Sports	0–1	Sylva-Sports (Le Locle)
FC Gloria (Le Locle)	2–1	Chênois
FC Fleurier	4–3	CS La Tour-de-Peilz
USI Dopolavoro Genève	3–1	FC Gardy-Jonction
Martigny-Sports	2–4	Sion
FC Sierre	3–1	FC Chippis
FC Tavannes	0–10	Delémont
Moutier	0–2	US Bienne-Boujean
FC Madretsch (Biel)	4–0	Thun
FC Nidau	5–2	FC Gerlafingen
FC Helvetia Bern	1–2	FC Viktoria Bern
8 September 1935
FC Gränichen	1–4	SC Wipkingen
FC Diana Zürich	3–2	SC Rapperswil
FC Thalwil	2–0	FC Küsnacht (ZH)
FC Wädenswil	4–2	Ballspielclub Zürich
FC Langnau am Albis (ZH)	4–0	FC Lachen
Baden	5–0	FC Industrie (ZH)
FC Altstetten (Zürich)	2–1	Uster
Arbon	5–2	FC Buchs (SG)
FC Fortuna (SG)	7–2	FC Neuhausen
FC Biberist	3–0	FC Lerchenfeld (Thun)
CA Genève	0–3	Concordia Yverdon
22 September 1935
FC Helvetik Basel	1–4	Rasenspiele Basel
Olympia Basel	1–4	FC Allschwil

== First principal round ==
The 14 clubs from the 1935–36 Nationalliga and the 24 clubs from this season's 1. Liga joined the competition in the first principal round.

=== Summary ===
Team 1	Score	Team 2
6 October 1935
Lausanne-Sport	1–2	Young Boys
Sion	1–0	Solothurn
Lugano	5–0	FC Oerlikon (ZH)
Grasshopper Club	4–0	Brühl
Nordstern	5–0	Blue Stars
Young Fellows	5–1	Juventus Zürich
Servette	8–1	Monthey
La Chaux-de-Fonds	12–0	FC Biberist
Aarau	7–2	FC Fleurier
Montreux-Sports	2–1 (a.e.t.) * Annulled	US Bienne-Boujean
Bern	10–1	Racing Club Lausanne
FC Olten	0–1	Urania Genève Sport
Cantonal Neuchâtel	0–0 (a.e.t.)	Biel-Bienne
Sylva-Sports (Le Locle)	2–5	FC Porrentruy
FC Wädenswil	0–2	Bellinzona
St. Gallen	8–0	FC Allschwil
FC Langnau am Albis (ZH)	3–4	FC Birsfelden
Locarno	6–1	FC Diana (Zürich)
Vevey Sports	7–0	USI Dopolavoro Genève
FC Viktoria Bern	1–2	Fribourg
SV Seebach	4–2	Concordia Basel
Sparta Schaffhausen	0–1	Kreuzlingen
Basel	0–2	Luzern
FC Thalwil	1–4	Baden
Winterthur	2–0	FC Altstetten (Zürich)
Arbon	3–1	Rasenspiele Basel
FC Nidau	3–4	Concordia Yverdon
FC Madretsch (Biel)	1–3	Delémont
FC Sierre	5–2	Etoile Carouge
Grenchen	8–1	FC Gloria (Le Locle)
Chiasso	4–0	Zürich
FC Wipkingen	1–3	FC Fortuna (SG)

- Note to match Montreux-Sports–Bienne-Boujean: After regular time, the score was 0–0, after which two periods of overtime were played, which ended in a 1–1 draw. The referee decided to play another period of overtime, which ended with Montreux winning 2–1. US Bienne-Boujean lodged an appeal, arguing that the match should have ended after two periods of overtime. The Swiss Football Association decided that a match cannot be played over two hours. The result was annulled and the match had to be replayed.

Replay

Team 1	Score	Team 2
10 November 1935
Montreux-Sports	5–1	US Bienne-Boujean
Biel-Bienne	3–0	Cantonal Neuchâtel

=== Matches ===
6 October 1935

Servette	8–1	Monthey
5x Belli; 1x Géza Szabo; 1x Aeby; 1x Vecchina	Servette summary	Goal

Stade des Charmilles, Geneva
- Sevette played the 1935/36 season in the Nationalliga (top-tier), Monthey in the 1. Liga (second tier).

6 October 1935

Aarau	7–2	FC Fleurier
Goal	FCA summary	Goal

Stadion Brügglifeld, Aarau
- Aarau played the 1935/36 season in the Nationalliga (top-tier), Fleurier in the 2. Liga (third tier).

6 October 1935
15:00

Basel	0–2	Luzern
	FCB summary	(0:1) Haiszau (0:2) Brönnimann

Landhof, Basel
Attendance: 3,500
Referee: (Switzerland) Alfred Spengler (Olten)
- Basel played the 1935/36 season in the Nationalliga (top-tier), Luzern in the 1. Liga (second tier), at the end of the season they won the 1. Liga championship and achieved promotion.

6 October 1935

Chiasso	4–0	Zürich
Gianinazzi 20' (1:0); Clerici 50' (2:0); Clerici (3:0); Gianinazzi 85' (4:0)	FCZ summary

Stadio Comunale Riva IV, Chiasso
Attendance: 600
Referee: (Switzerland) Mario Grassi (Balerna)
- Chiasso and Zürich both played the 1935/36 season in the 1. Liga (second tier).

== Round 2 ==
=== Summary ===
Team 1	Score	Team 2
17 November 1935
FC Sierre	0–4	Grenchen
Biel-Bienne	6–1	FC Porrentruy
Young Boys	8–1	Sion
Bern	14–1	Urania Genève Sport
Concordia Yverdon	2–1	Delémont
Montreux-Sports	0–6	Aarau
Vevey Sports	4–1	Fribourg
Luzern	5–0	Baden
Lugano	1–0	Grasshopper Club
Nordstern	2–3	Young Fellows
FC Birsfelden	2–7	Locarno
SV Seebach	1–3	Kreuzlingen
Winterthur	3–1	Arbon
Chiasso	5–1	FC Fortuna (SG)
Servette	ppd	La Chaux-de-Fonds
Bellinzona	ppd *	St. Gallen (t)

- Note (t): Match Bellinzona–St. Gallen was posponed, but no date for a replay could be agreed between the two teams. St. Gallen qualified on toss of a coin.

Rescheduled

Team 1	Score	Team 2
1 December 1935
Servette	2–0	La Chaux-de-Fonds

=== Matches ===
17 November 1935

Montreux-Sports	0–6	Aarau
	FCA summary	Goal

Stade de Chailly, Montreux
- Montreux-Sports played the 1935/36 season in the 1. Liga (second tier).

1 December 1935

Servette	2–0	La Chaux-de-Fonds
Aubert (1:0); Kramer (2:0)	Servette summary

Stade des Charmilles, Geneva
- Both Servette and La Chaux-de-Fonds played the 1935/36 season in the Nationalliga (top-tier)

== Round 3 ==
=== Summary ===
Team 1	Score	Team 2
1 December 1935
Locarno	1–0	Winterthur
Lugano	4–1	Kreuzlingen
Chiasso	0–2	Young Fellows
Concordia Yverdon	1–3	Aarau
St. Gallen	1–2	Luzern
Grenchen	0–0 abd *	Young Boys
Biel-Bienne	ppd *	Bern
1 January 1936
Vevey Sports	2–8	Servette

- The match Grenchen–Young Boys was abandoned at 50 minutes (storm) and was rescheduled.
- The match Biel-Bienne–Bern was postponed due to bad weather.

Rescheduled

Team 1	Score	Team 2
2 January 1936
Young Boys	5–2	Grenchen
19 January 1936
Biel-Bienne	2–2 (a.e.t.)	Bern

Replay

Team 1	Score	Team 2
2 February 1936
Bern	1–1 (a.e.t.)	Biel-Bienne

Second replay

Team 1	Score	Team 2
5 February 1936
Bern	1–0	Biel-Bienne

=== Matches ===
1 December 1935

Chiasso	0–2	Young Fellows
	Summary	(0:1) Frigerio (0:2) Tögel

Stadio Comunale, Chiasso
- Chiasso played the 1935/36 season in the 1. Liga (second tier), Young Fellows in the top-tier.

1 December 1935

Concordia Yverdon	1–3	Aarau
4' (1:0)	FCA summary	40' (1:1); 68' (1:2); 89' (1:3)

Stade Municipal, Yverdon-les-Bains
- Concordia Yverdon played the 1935/36 season in the 2. Liga (third tier), Aarau in the top-tier.

1 January 1936

Vevey Sports	2–8	Servette
Conne; Syrvet	Servette summary	2x Vecchina; 3x Walaschek; Buchoux; 2x Nývlt

Stade de Copet, Vevey
- Vevey Sports played the 1935/36 season in the 1. Liga (second tier), Servette in the top-tier.

== Quarter-finals ==
=== Summary ===
Team 1	Score	Team 2
2 February 1936
Servette	3–0	Luzern
Lugano	1–5	Young Fellows
Aarau	ppd	Young Boys
11 February 1936
Bern	8–0	Locarno

Rescheduled

Team 1	Score	Team 2
12 February 1936
Young Boys	5–0	Aarau

=== Matches ===
2 February 1936

Servette	3–0	Luzern
S. Colongo (1:0); Aeby (2:0); Buchoux (3:0)	Servette summary

Stade des Charmilles, Geneva

2 February 1936

Lugano	1–5	Young Fellows
Peverelli 85' (1:5)	Summary	22' (o.g.) Bassi; 33' (0:2) Tögel; 35' (0:3) Saccani; 50' (0:4) Saccani; 75' (0:5) Tögel

Campo Marzio, Lugano

11 February 1936

Bern	8–0	Locarno
Townley (1:0); Weber (2:0); 2x Billeter; 2x Pinter; Kielholz; Bösch	Summary

Stadion Neufeld, Bern

12 February 1936

Young Boys	5–0	Aarau
Petrak 5' (1:0); Liniger 36' (2:0); Sipos 50' (3:0); Petrak 60' (4:0); P. Aebi 80' (5:0)	FCA summary

Wankdorf Stadium, Bern

== Semi-finals ==
=== Summary ===
Team 1	Score	Team 2
1 March 1936
Young Fellows	4–1	Young Boys
Servette	1–1 (a.e.t.)	Bern

Replay

Team 1	Score	Team 2
25 March 1936
Bern	2–2 (a.e.t.)	Servette (t)

=== Matches ===
1 March 1936

Young Fellows	4–1	Young Boys
Tögel 15' (1:1); Diebold 39' (2:1); Ciseri 48' (3:1); Tögel 87' (4:1)	Summary	8' (0:1) P. Aebi

Förrlibuck, Zürich
Attendance: 7,000
Referee: (Switzerland) Karl Wunderlin (Basel)

1 March 1936

Servette	1–1 (a.e.t.)	Bern
Buchoux 83' (1:1)	Servette summary	80' (o.g.) Riva

Pontaise, Lausanne
Attendance: 6,000
Referee: (Switzerland) William Bangerter (La Chaux-de-Fonds)

25 March 1936
Replay

Bern	2–2 (a.e.t.)	Servette
Bösch 4' (1:0); Kielholz 49' (2:0)	Servette summary	63' (2:1) Walaschek; Colongo 74' (2:2)

Stadion Neufeld, Bern
Attendance: 2,500
Referee: (Switzerland) Ernest Meyer (Lausanne)
- Bern rejected Servette's offer of a second replay, so a coin toss was held. Servette qualified on (t).

== Final ==
The final was held in Zürich, at the Förrlibuck, on Easter Monday 1936.

=== Summary ===
Team 1	Score	Team 2
13 April 1936
Young Fellows	2–0	Servette

=== Telegram ===
13 April 1936
15:30

Young Fellows	2–0	Servette
Tögel 1' (1:0); Frigerio 47' (2:0)	Fussball-Schweiz summary Servette summary

Förrlibuck, Zürich
Attendance: 7,000
Referee: (Switzerland) Karl Wunderlin (Basel)

Young Fellows won the cup and this was the club's first cup title. In fact, to this date, this cup victory is the only title in the history of the Young Fellows Zurich.

== Further in Swiss football ==
- 1935–36 Nationalliga
- 1935–36 Swiss 1. Liga

== Sources ==
- Fussball-Schweiz
- Switzerland 1935–36 at RSSSF

Preceded by 1934–35	Swiss Cup seasons	Succeeded by 1936–37
