= 1944–45 Swiss Cup =

Tournament details
- Country: Switzerland

Final positions
- Champions: Young Boys
- Runners-up: St. Gallen

The 1944–45 Swiss Cup was the 20th season of Switzerland's football cup competition, organised annually since the 1925–26 season by the Swiss Football Association.

== Overview ==
=== Preamble ===
In Switzerland during the second world war, sport became an integral part of the "spiritual national defense". This was a political and cultural movement that had already become increasingly important during the late 1930s. Politicians, intellectuals and media professionals had increasingly called for measures to strengthen Switzerland's basic cultural values. Since the Nationalliga games were also considered to be one of the activities that seemed important for maintaining the morale of the population, the military authorities put considerably fewer obstacles in the way of the top players as they had during the previous World War.

=== ASF/SFV ===
Therefore, it came about that the Swiss Football Association (ASF/SFV) expanded themselves. The decision of the extraordinary assembly, held on 9 October 1943 in Lugano, was to double the number of members to 28 clubs for the 1944–45 season. The Nationalliga was divided into two strength classes each with 14 teams. The previous Nationalliga became the Nationalliga A (NLA), while the Nationalliga B (NLB) was newly formed with the 14 best teams of the previous 1. Liga season.

=== Format ===
This season's cup competition was again expanded. It began with the first round, which was played on the week-end of the 15 October 1944. The competition was to be completed on Easter Monday, 2 April 1945, with the final, which, since 1937, was traditionally held in the country's capital, at the former Wankdorf Stadium in Bern. The lower league teams that had qualified themselves for the competition and the clubs from this season's 1. Liga joined the competition in the first round. The clubs from this season's Nationalliga A (NLA) and from this season's Nationalliga B (NLB) were given byes for the first two rounds. These teams joined the competition in the third round, which was played on the week-end of 3 December.

The matches were played in a knockout format. In the event of a draw after 90 minutes, the match went into extra time. In the event of a draw at the end of extra time, if agreed between the clubs, a replay was foreseen and this was played on the visiting team's pitch. Rules and regulations to this situation were altered and amended continuously by each regional football association, due to the current situation (second world war). If the replay ended in a draw after extra time, or if a replay had not been agreed, a toss of a coin would establish the team that qualified for the next round.

== Round 1 ==
In the first round, the lower league teams that had qualified themselves for the competition through their regional football association's own regional cup competitions or had achieved their association's requirements, competed here together with all of the teams from this years 1. Liga. Reserve teams were not qualified for the competition. Whenever possible, the draw respected local regionalities. Most of the games of the first round were played on Saturday 15 October, however, some games were played a few weeks later.

=== Summary ===
Team 1	Score	Team 2
15 October 1944
FC Langenthal	FF awd 3–0	FC Gränichen
FC Erlinsbach	FF awd 0–3	FC Reinach
Schaffhausen	2–2 (a.e.t.)	Kreuzlingen
FC Tössfeld	0–2	Winterthur
FC Altstetten (Zürich)	4–0	AS Ticinese
FC Altdorf (Uri)	2–1 (a.e.t.)	Kickers Luzern
Zofingen	2–1 (a.e.t.)	Baden
FC Birsfelden	2–5	Delémont
FC Porrentruy	2–0	Concordia
FC Allschwil	3–2	SC Kleinhüningen
Binningen	0–2 * awd 3–0	FC Pratteln
Zähringia Bern	1–2	Thun
FC Lerchenfeld (Thun)	0–3	FC Helvetia Bern
Moutier	2–0	FC Reconvilier
FC Tavannes	2–3	FC Tramelan
US Bienne-Boujean	3–1	FC Aurore Bienne
Wohlen	2–1	Schöftland
FC Wil	4–0	Arbon
Red Star	2–3	FC Wipkingen (ZH)
FC Schlieren (ZH)	0–1	Blue Stars
Köniz	3–1	Central Fribourg
Emmenbrücke	3–1	FC Horgen
Black Stars	2–0	FC Olten
FC Gerlafingen	5–1	FC Biberist
Minerva Bern	1–2 (a.e.t.)	FC Langnau im Emmental
FC Domat-Ems	2–0	FC Widnau
FC Fortuna (SG)	1–0	Gossau
FC Weinfelden	5–6	FC Neuhausen
FC Rohrschach	1–8	FC Amriswil
FC Wülflingen	1–1 (a.e.t.)	FC Phönix (Winterthur)
FC Oerlikon (ZH)	8–4	FC Hakoah (Zürich)
Sporting Aarau	3–2	FC Muhen
FC Lenzburg	3–2	FC Schönenwerd
Old Boys	2–0 * awd 0–3	FC Breitenbach
FC Mett	2–3	FC Nidau
FC Interlaken	2–0	FC Victoria Bern
FC Grünstern (Ipsach)	4–3	FC Bözingen 34
Wacker Grenchen	3–1	Burgdorf
Luzern SC	11–3	FC Zug
FC Kirchberg	5–0	FC Herzogenbuchsee
ES Malley	1–3	Vevey Sports
CA Genève	1–4	FC Gardy-Jonction (GE)
Stade Lausanne	2–0	FC Renens
FC Forward Morges	1–3	Racing Club Lausanne
FC Vignoble Cully	4–3	Montreux-Sports
FC Saint-Maurice	1–3	FC Sierre
FC Grône	2–3	Sion
Mendrisio	2–1	Chiasso
FC Broc	0–4	Bulle
Amical-Abattoirs GE	4–1	Carouge Stade
US Campagnes (GE)	1–3	Regina Genève
FC Compesières	0–2	Estella Cointrin
FC La Neuveville	3–2	FC Colombier
FC Noiraigue	2–4	FC Fleurier
Stade Nyonnais	2–0	Etoile Lucens
FC Orbe	5–2	FC Le Sentier
CS La Tour-de-Peilz	4–2	FC Bex
FC Stade Payerne	2–4	White Star Yverdon
FC Yverdon	0–7	Concordia Yverdon
Bodio	3–2	GC Biasca
Martigny-Sports	2–3	FC Aigle
Lamone Sportiva	1–2	US Giubiasco
22 October 1944
FC Wiedikon	1–2	Uster
SV Seebach	2–2 (a.e.t.) *	Polizei Zürich (t)
Laufen	0–2	Polizei Basel
FC Rapperswil	1–2	FC Turgi
29 October 1944
FC Rüti (ZH)	6–1	FC Näfels/Glarus
FC Wädenswil	1–3	FC Adliswil
SV Sissach	2–0	FC Riehen
5 November 1944
FC Thalwil	3–2	FC Stäfa (ZH)
Saint-Imier-Sports	2–4	Le Locle-Sports
Monthey	5–0	FC Chalais

- Note match Binningen–Pratteln: protest and awarded 3–0. A player of Pratteln was not qualified
- Note match Old Boys–Breitenbach: protest and awarded 0–3 A player of Old Boys was not qualified.
- Note match Seebach–Polizei Zürich: no replay was agreed. Polizei Zürich qualified on toss of a coin.

Replays

Team 1	Score	Team 2
22 October 1944
Kreuzlingen	1–5	Schaffhausen
29 October 1944
FC Phönix (Winterthur)	2–0	FC Wülflingen

=== Matches ===
15 October 1944

Sporting Aarau	3–2	FC Muhen
Goal	FCA summary	Goal

Stadion Brügglifeld, Aarau

== Round 2 ==
=== Summary ===
==== Region Ostschweiz ====
Team 1	Score	Team 2
12 November 1944
Winterthur	2–1	FC Phönix (Winterthur)
Schaffhausen	6–2	FC Neuhausen
19 November 1944
FC Wil	1–2	FC Amriswil
FC Domat-Ems	4–3	FC Fortuna (SG)

==== Region Zürich ====
Team 1	Score	Team 2
12 November 1944
FC Adliswil	1–0	FC Rüti (ZH)
26 November 1944
FC Oerlikon	1–2	Blue Stars
FC Wipkingen (ZH)	2–1 (a.e.t.)	Polizei Zürich
FC Altstetten (Zürich)	n/p *	Uster (t)

- The match Altstetten–Uster was not played (unplayable pitch due to rain). No replay was agreed. Uster qualified on toss of a coin.

==== Region Innerschweiz ====
Team 1	Score	Team 2
12 November 1944
Emmenbrücke	0–3	Wohlen
Luzerner SC	7–1	FC Thalwil

==== Region Aargau ====
Team 1	Score	Team 2
12 November 1944
FC Reinach (AG)	2–5	FC Turgi
Sporting Aarau	4–3	FC Lenzburg

==== Region Nordwestschweiz ====
Team 1	Score	Team 2
12 November 1944
Zofingen	3–1	Polizei Basel
FC Allschwil	11–0	Black Stars
192 November 1944
SV Sissach	1–3	Binningen

==== Region Zentralschweiz ====
Team 1	Score	Team 2
12 November 1944
FC Helvetia Bern	4–0	FC Grünstern (Ipsach)
Köniz	2–3 (a.e.t.)	FC Langnau im Emmental
FC Interlaken	0–5	Thun
FC Langenthal	6–0	US Bienne-Boujean
FC Kirchberg	0–3	Wacker Grenchen
FC La Neuveville	1–5	FC Nidau
Moutier	4–2	FC Tramelan
FC Porrentruy	8–1	Delémont
FC Gerlafingen	4–1	FC Breitenbach

==== Region Romande ====
Team 1	Score	Team 2
12 November 1944
Regina Genève	1–4	FC Gardy-Jonction (GE)
Estella Cointrin	0–1	Amical-Abattoirs GE
FC Orbe	1–2	Stade Lausanne
Stade Nyonnais	4–1	Racing Club Lausanne
Vevey Sports	3–0	Bulle
Vignoble Cully	2–3	CS La Tour-de-Peilz
White Star Yverdon	0–3	Concordia Yverdon
Monthey	6–0	FC Sierre
Sion	2–1	FC Aigle
19 November 1944
FC Fleurier	1–0	Le Locle-Sports

==== Region Ticino ====
Team 1	Score	Team 2
12 November 1944
Bodio	2–1	FC Altdorf (Uri)
Mendrisio	2–1	US Giubiasco

=== Matches ===
12 November 1944

Sporting Aarau	4–3	FC Lenzburg
Goal	FCA summary	Goal

Stadion Brügglifeld, Aarau

== Round 3 ==
=== Summary ===
Team 1	Score	Team 2
3 December 1944
Brühl	1–2 (a.e.t.)	FC Amriswil
Locarno	5–2	FC Bodio
SC Zug	2–0	Wohlen
FC Turgi	1–2	Luzern
Luzerner Sportclub	2–0	FC Wipkingen (ZH)
St. Gallen	8–1	FC Ems
Aarau	4–1	Sporting Club Aarau
US Pro Daro	3–0	Mendrisio
Young Fellows	3–2 (a.e.t.)	Schaffhausen
Binningen	2–9	Nordstern
La Chaux-de-Fonds	3–0	FC Fleurier
FC Helvetia Bern	0–1	Grenchen
FC Gerlafingen	0–3	SC Derendingen
Urania Genève Sport	2–0	Stade Nyonnais
Thun	0–5	Young Boys
Bern	7–1	FC Langnau im Emmental
Étoile-Sporting	6–3	Concordia Yverdon
FC Allschwil	0–6	Basel
Zofingen	2–1	FC Langenthal
Solothurn	4–0	Wacker Grenchen
Stade Lausanne	0–0 (a.e.t.)	Fribourg
Biel-Bienne	2–1	FC Nidau
Vevey Sports	0–1	Cantonal Neuchâtel
FC Adliswil	1–3	Grasshopper Club
Blue Stars	2–1	Zürich
Winterthur	1–3	Bellinzona
Lugano	5–0	Uster
CS La Tour-de-Peilz	0–14	Lausanne-Sport
FC Porrentruy	0–1 (a.e.t.)	Moutier
FC Gardy-Jonction (GE)	1–8	Servette
Amical-Abattoirs GE	0–1	CS International Genève
Sion	0–0 abandoned	Monthey

Replays

Team 1	Score	Team 2
10 December 1944
Fribourg	0–1	Stade Lausanne
Monthey	2–3 (a.e.t.)	Sion

=== Matches ===
3 December 1944

Aarau	4–1	Sporting Club Aarau
Goal	FCA summary	Goal

Stadion Brügglifeld, Aarau

3 December 1944
14:00

FC Allschwil	0–6	Basel
	FCB summary	17' (0:1) Bader; 18' (0:2) Bader; 48' (0:3) Bader (0:4) Bader (0:5) Oberer (0:6) Bader

Sportplatz Bankverein, Allschwil
Attendance: 2,000
Referee: (Switzerland) Eugen Scherz (Bern)
- FC Allschwil played the 1944/45 season in the 2. Liga (fourth tier).

3 December 1944

Blue Stars	2–1	Zürich
Bertschi (pen.); Zanetti 65' (2:1)	FCZ summary	52' (1:1) Hürlimann; (yellow card) Fader

Letzigrund, Zürich
Attendance: 2,000
Referee: (Switzerland) Josef Schürch (Winterthur)

3 December 1944

FC Gardy-Jonction (GE)	1–8	Servette
Goal	Servette summary	2x Belli; 6x Rey

- FC Gardy-Jonction played the 1944/45 season in the 2. Liga (fourth tier) and at the end of the season won promotion.

== Round 4 ==
=== Summary ===
Team 1	Score	Team 2
24 December 1944
Biel-Bienne	0–2 (a.e.t.)	Cantonal Neuchâtel
La Chaux-de-Fonds	0–1	Grenchen
Bellinzona	2–2 (a.e.t.)	Lugano
Bern	1–1 (a.e.t.)	Étoile-Sporting
Servette	0–3	CS International Genève
Young Fellows	2–0	Nordstern
FC Amriswil	0–2	Locarno
SC Zug	2–1 (a.e.t.)	Luzern
Luzerner Sportclub	0–4	St. Gallen
Aarau	2–0	US Pro Daro
SC Derendingen	2–3	Urania Genève Sport
Sion	2–4	Young Boys
Basel	3–1	Zofingen
Solothurn	2–3	Stade Lausanne
Grasshopper Club	4–1	Blue Stars
Lausanne-Sport	2–1	Moutier

Replays

Team 1	Score	Team 2
14 January 1945
Lugano	3–2	Bellinzona
Étoile-Sporting	4–1	Bern

=== Matches ===
24 December 1944

Servette	0–3	CS International Genève
	Servette summary	Goal

Stade des Charmilles, Geneva
- CS International played 1944/45 in the 2. Liga (fourth tier).

24 December 1944

Aarau	2–0	US Pro Daro
Goal	FCA summary

Stadion Brügglifeld, Aarau
- US Pro Daro played 1944/45 in the 2. Liga (fourth tier)

24 December 1944
14:30

Basel	3–1	SC Zofingen
Suter (1:0); Kappenberger 30' (2:0); Monigatti 40' (3:0)	Summary	(pen. 3:1) Conus

Landhof, Basel
Attendance: 1,000
Referee: (Switzerland) Hermann Arn (Grenchen)
- Zofingen played the 1944/45 season in the 1. Liga (third tier)

== Round 5 ==
=== Summary ===
Team 1	Score	Team 2
21 January 1945
Locarno	2–1	SC Zug
Grenchen'	4–1	Urania Genève Sport
St. Gallen	3–0	Basel
Stade Lausanne	0–2 (a.e.t.)	Cantonal Neuchâtel
Lausanne-Sport	0–3	CS International Genève
28 January 1945
Aarau	2–3	Young Fellows
19 February 1945
Grasshopper Club	1–2	Lugano
Young Boys	10–0	Étoile-Sporting

=== Matches ===
21 January 1945

St. Gallen	3–0	Basel
Hager 65' (1:0); Wagner 85' (2:0); Casali 87' (3:0)	FCB summary

Espenmoos, St. Gallen
Attendance: 1,000
Referee: (Switzerland) Schmidsberger (Zürich)

28 January 1945

Aarau	2–3	Young Fellows
Goal	FCA summary	Goal

Stadion Brügglifeld, Aarau

== Quarter-finals ==
=== Summary ===
Team 1	Score	Team 2
26 February 1945
Locarno	0–1	Young Fellows
Grenchen	0–2	Young Boys
St. Gallen	3–1	Cantonal Neuchâtel
Lugano	1–2	CS International Genève

== Semi-finals ==
=== Summary ===
Team 1	Score	Team 2
11 March 1945
Young Fellows	1–1 (a.e.t.)	Young Boys
St. Gallen	1–0 (a.e.t.)	CS International Genève

Replay

Team 1	Score	Team 2
25 March 1945
Young Boys	0–0 (a.e.t.)	Young Fellows

Second replay

Team 1	Score	Team 2
31 March 1945
Young Fellows	2–4	Young Boys

=== Matches ===
11 March 1945

Young Fellows	1–1 (a.e.t.)	Young Boys
Lusenti 27' (1:0)	summary	75' (1:1) Walaschek

Letzigrund, Zürich

11 March 1945

St. Gallen	1–0 (a.e.t.)	CS International Genève
Casali 91' (1:0)	summary

Pontaise, Lausanne

25 March 1945

Young Boys	0–0 (a.e.t.)	Young Fellows
Goal	summary	Goal

Wankdorf Stadium, Bern

31 March 1945

Young Fellows	2–4	Young Boys
Flühmann 44' (o.g.); 70' (o.g.)	summary	24' (0:1) Streun; 30' (0:2) Bernhard; 39' (0:3) Knecht (2:4) Fink

Landhof, Basel
Referee: 27 Streun, 30 Bernhard, 39 Knecht, Fink

== Final ==
The final was held in the capital Bern, at the former Wankdorf Stadium, on Easter Monday 1945.

=== Summary ===
Team 1	Score	Team 2
2 April 1945
Young Boys	2–0 (a.e.t.)	St. Gallen

=== Telegram ===
2 April 1945

Young Boys	2–0 (a.e.t.)	St. Gallen
Trachsel 97' (1:0); Walaschek 108' (pen.)	Fussball-Schweiz summary

Wankdorf Stadium, Bern
Attendance: 15,000
Referee: (Switzerland) Jean Lutz (Geneva)

Young Boys won the cup and this was the club's second cup title to this date.

== Further in Swiss football ==
- 1944–45 Nationalliga A
- 1944–45 Nationalliga B
- 1944–45 Swiss 1. Liga

== Sources ==
- Fussball-Schweiz
- FCB Cup games 1944–45 at fcb-achiv.ch
- Switzerland 1944–45 at RSSSF

Preceded by 1943–44	Swiss Cup seasons	Succeeded by 1945–46
