= 1935–36 Swiss 1. Liga =

1. Liga
- Season: 1935–36
- Champions: 1. Liga champions: Luzern; Group West winners: Grenchen; Group East winners: Luzern
- Promoted: Luzern
- Relegated: Group West: Racing Club Lausanne; Etoile Carouge; Group East: Seebach
- Matches: twice 132 plus 2 play-offs and 2 play-outs total: 268 matches

The 1935–36 1. Liga season was the 5th season of the 1. Liga since its creation in 1931. At this time, the 1. Liga was the second-tier of the Swiss football league system.

== Overview ==
In the run-up to this season, there were further changes to the league system. There were now 24 clubs competing in the 1st division, this being two more clubs than in the 1934/35 season and six more than in the 1933/34 season. These 24 clubs were divided into two regional groups, each with 12 teams. The teams in each group played a double round-robin to decide their league position. Two points were awarded for a win and one point was awarded for a draw. Both group winners then contested a play-off round to decide the championship and the one sole promotion slot to the top-tier Nationalliga. The two last placed team in each group were to be directly relegated to the 2. Liga (third tier).

== Group West ==
=== Teams, locations ===
Club	Based in	Canton	Stadium	Capacity
FC Cantonal Neuchâtel	Neuchâtel	Neuchâtel	Stade de la Maladière	25,500
Étoile Carouge FC	Carouge	Geneva	Stade de la Fontenette	3,690
FC Fribourg	Fribourg	Fribourg	Stade Universitaire	9,000
FC Grenchen	Grenchen	Solothurn	Stadium Brühl	15,100
FC Monthey	Monthey	Valais	Stade Philippe Pottier	1,800
FC Montreux-Sports	Montreux	Vaud	Stade de Chailly	1,000
FC Olten	Olten	Solothurn	Sportanlagen Kleinholz	8,000
FC Porrentruy	Porrentruy	Jura	Stade du Tirage	4,226
Racing Club Lausanne	Lausanne	Vaud	Centre sportif de la Tuilière	1,000
FC Solothurn	Solothurn	Solothurn	Stadion FC Solothurn	6,750
Urania Genève Sport	Genève	Geneva	Stade de Frontenex	4,000
Vevey Sports	Vevey	Vaud	Stade de Copet	4,000

=== Final league table ===
Pos	Team	Pld	W	D	L	GF	GA	GD	Pts	Qualification or relegation
1	FC Grenchen	22	16	3	3	74	26	+48	35	To promotion play-off
2	FC Solothurn	22	14	4	4	63	35	+28	32	
3	Vevey Sports	22	13	3	6	69	52	+17	29	
4	FC Montreux-Sports	22	13	3	6	55	42	+13	29	
5	FC Cantonal Neuchâtel	22	13	1	8	69	41	+28	27	
6	FC Fribourg	22	10	1	11	37	37	0	21	
7	FC Monthey	22	9	2	11	44	60	−16	20	
8	Urania Genève Sport	22	7	4	11	36	52	−16	18	
9	FC Olten	22	6	5	11	45	46	−1	17	
10	FC Porrentruy	22	6	4	12	47	57	−10	16	
11	Racing Club Lausanne	22	5	3	14	33	72	−39	13	Relegation to 2. Liga
12	Etoile Carouge FC	22	3	1	18	20	72	−52	7	Relegation to 2. Liga

Source: RSSSF
Rules for classification: 1) Points; 2) Goal difference within the league, but decider play-off for qualifiers.

== Group East ==
=== Teams, locations ===
Club	Based in	Canton	Stadium	Capacity
FC Blue Stars Zürich	Zürich	Zürich	Hardhof	1,000
SC Brühl	St. Gallen	St. Gallen	Paul-Grüninger-Stadion	4,200
FC Chiasso	Chiasso	Ticino	Stadio Comunale Riva IV	4,000
FC Concordia Basel	Basel	Basel-Stadt	Stadion Rankhof	7,000
SC Juventus Zürich	Zürich	Zürich	Utogrund	2,850
FC Kreuzlingen	Kreuzlingen	Thurgau	Sportplatz Hafenareal	1,200
Luzern	Lucerne	Lucerne	Stadion Allmend	25,000
FC Oerlikon	Oerlikon (Zürich)	Zürich	Sportanlage Neudorf	1,000
Sparta-Schaffhausen	Schaffhausen	Schaffhausen	Stadion Breite	7,300
FC Seebach Zürich	Zürich	Zürich	Eichrain	1,000
FC Winterthur	Winterthur	Zürich	Schützenwiese	8,550
FC Zürich	Zürich	Zürich	Letzigrund	25,000

=== Final league table ===
Pos	Team	Pld	W	D	L	GF	GA	GD	Pts	Qualification or relegation
1	Luzern	22	10	9	3	45	27	+18	29	To promotion play-off
2	SC Juventus Zürich	22	11	5	6	51	44	+7	27	
3	SC Brühl	22	9	6	7	41	33	+8	24	
4	FC Chiasso	22	9	5	8	51	45	+6	23	
5	FC Oerlikon	22	10	3	9	51	52	−1	23	
6	FC Kreuzlingen	22	9	4	9	42	50	−8	22	
7	FC Winterthur	22	8	5	9	33	33	0	21	
8	FC Blue Stars Zürich	22	8	5	9	36	44	−8	21	
9	FC Zürich	22	8	3	11	35	45	−10	19	
10	FC Concordia Basel	22	8	3	11	33	50	−17	19	
11	Sparta-Schaffhausen	22	5	8	9	38	35	+3	18	Play-out against relegation
12	FC Seebach Zürich	22	5	8	9	35	33	+2	18	Play-out against relegation

Source: RSSSF
Rules for classification: 1) Points; 2) Goal difference within the league, but decider play-off for qualifiers.

== Promotion, relegation ==
The two group winners played a two legged tie for the title of 1. Liga champions and for promotion to the 1936–37 Nationalliga. The games were played on

=== Promotion play-off ===
Team 1	Score	Team 2
Grenchen	0–2	Luzern
Luzern	1–1	Grenchen

Luzern won, became 1. Liga champions and were promoted. Grenchen remain in the division for the next season.

=== Relegation play-out ===
Sparta-Schaffhausen and FC Seebach had ended the season on relegation slots and both were relegated in first instance. However, BSC Old Boys, one of the winners of the four 2. Liga groups, waived their rights to promotion. Therefore this play-out against relegation was required.

Team 1	Score	Team 2
Sparta-Schaffhausen	0–0	Seebach
Seebach	1–2	Sparta-Schaffhausen

Sparta-Schaffhausen won, thus saved themsilves from relegation and remained in the division for the next season. Seebach were relegated.

== Further in Swiss football ==
- 1935–36 Nationalliga
- 1935–36 Swiss Cup

== Sources ==
- Switzerland 1935–36 at RSSSF

Preceded by 1934–35	Seasons in Swiss 1. Liga	Succeeded by 1936–37
