= 1935–36 Nationalliga =

39th season of top-tier Swiss football

Nationalliga
- Season: 1935–36
- Dates: 25 August 1935 to 17 May 1936
- Champions: Lausanne-Sports
- Relegated: Locarno; Aarau
- Matches: 182
- Top goalscorer: Willy Jäggi (Lausanne-Sports); 30 goals

The following is the summary of the Swiss National League in the 1935–36 football season. This was the 39th season of top-tier football in Switzerland.

== Overview ==
For this season, the Swiss Football Association (ASF/SFV) had 14 member clubs and 24 clubs in the second-tier. However, it had been decided to modify the format, the number of clubs would be reduced in the top-tier within two years, 13 next season and 12 in the following. From then onwards the format would remain unchanged.

The 14 top-tier teams played a double round-robin to decide their league table positions. Two points were awarded for a win and one point was awarded for a draw. The first placed team at the end of the season would be awarded the Swiss championship title and the last two placed teams would be relegated to the 1936–37 1. Liga. Only one team from the second tier 1. Liga would achieve promotion this season.

== Nationalliga ==
The league season began with the first matchday on 25 August 1935 and was concluded with the last round on 17 May 1936.

=== Teams, locations ===
Team	Based in	Canton	Stadium	Capacity
FC Aarau	Aarau	Aargau	Stadion Brügglifeld	9,240
FC Basel	Basel	Basel-Stadt	Landhof	4,000
FC Bern	Bern	Bern	Stadion Neufeld	14,000
FC Biel-Bienne	Biel/Bienne	Bern	Stadion Gurzelen	5,500
Grasshopper Club Zürich	Zürich	Zürich	Hardturm	20,000
FC La Chaux-de-Fonds	La Chaux-de-Fonds	Neuchâtel	Centre Sportif de la Charrière	12,700
FC Lausanne-Sport	Lausanne	Vaud	Pontaise	30,000
FC Locarno	Locarno	Ticino	Stadio comunale Lido	5,000
FC Lugano	Lugano	Ticino	Cornaredo Stadium	6,330
FC Nordstern Basel	Basel	Basel-Stadt	Rankhof	7,600
Servette FC	Geneva	Geneva	Stade des Charmilles	27,000
FC St. Gallen	St. Gallen	St. Gallen	Espenmoos	11,000
BSC Young Boys	Bern	Bern	Wankdorf Stadium	56,000
FC Young Fellows	Zürich	Zürich	Utogrund	2,850

=== Final league table ===
Pos	Team	Pld	W	D	L	GF	GA	GD	Pts	Qualification or relegation
1	Lausanne-Sports	26	17	7	2	75	23	+52	41	Swiss Champions
2	Young Fellows Zürich	26	16	6	4	62	34	+28	38	Swiss Cup winners
3	Grasshopper Club	26	15	6	5	64	25	+39	36	
4	Bern	26	15	4	7	71	49	+22	34	
5	Biel-Bienne	26	12	4	10	60	46	+14	28	
6	Young Boys	26	10	6	10	38	40	−2	26	
7	Servette	26	8	8	10	37	46	−9	24	
8	Lugano	26	7	9	10	38	47	−9	23	
9	St. Gallen	26	9	5	12	36	52	−16	23	
10	Basel	26	8	4	14	51	59	−8	20	
11	Nordstern Basel	26	8	4	14	41	60	−19	20	
12	La Chaux-de-Fonds	26	6	6	14	47	69	−22	18	
13	Locarno	26	7	3	16	35	62	−27	17	Relegated to 1936–37 1. Liga
14	Aarau	26	5	6	15	47	90	−43	16	Relegated to 1936–37 1. Liga

Source: rsssf.com
Rules for classification: 1) Points; 2) Goal difference within the league, however with play-off for qualifiers;

=== Results ===
Home \ Away	AAR	BAS	BER	BB	CDF	GCZ	LS	LOC	LUG	NOR	SER	STG	YB	YFZ
Aarau		2–4	2–8	2–4	5–5	2–2	0–3	3–4	2–5	5–2	4–1	2–2	3–1	1–1
Basel	2–0		1–5	2–0	6–0	2–1	0–3	6–0	2–3	4–1	1–0	2–3	1–1	2–3
Bern	1–1	4–2		1–1	5–0	0–5	4–2	3–0	2–1	4–0	0–4	9–1	0–1	1–2
Biel-Bienne	8–3	6–2	2–5		2–1	1–0	2–2	1–3	2–2	2–0	5–1	3–1	0–0	2–0
La Chaux-de-Fonds	3–2	1–0	3–7	1–2		1–2	0–1	7–2	1–2	3–3	4–1	0–1	1–1	4–1
Grasshopper Club	8–0	5–2	4–0	2–1	7–0		2–2	3–1	2–1	2–0	2–3	2–0	2–4	1–1
Lausanne-Sports	6–0	6–0	7–0	2–0	3–3	0–0		0–0	4–2	9–1	2–0	5–1	1–0	2–1
Locarno	4–1	4–3	1–2	2–9	2–2	0–1	1–1		2–1	3–0	0–1	2–1	0–1	0–1
Lugano	1–1	1–1	1–1	2–1	0–2	0–4	0–1	3–1		2–0	1–0	1–2	2–2	2–2
Nordstern	2–1	0–0	3–4	2–1	4–1	0–1	1–4	2–0	1–1		2–1	4–0	5–0	1–3
Servette	5–1	2–2	3–1	0–1	1–1	1–1	0–4	2–1	3–3	2–2		1–0	1–0	0–0
St. Gallen	1–2	3–2	2–2	2–1	2–1	0–0	3–3	1–0	2–0	1–2	1–1		5–2	0–1
Young Boys	0–1	1–0	0–1	2–0	3–1	1–4	0–1	3–1	1–1	4–2	4–0	3–1		0–3
Young Fellows	7–1	4–2	0–1	6–3	4–1	2–1	2–1	4–1	5–0	2–1	3–3	1–0	3–3	

Source: rsssf.com
Legend: Blue = home team win; Yellow = draw; Red = away team win.

=== Topscorers ===
Rank	Player	Nat.	Goals	Club
1.	Willy Jäggi	(Switzerland)	30	Lausanne-Sports
2.	Alessandro Frigerio	(Switzerland)	27	Young Fellows
3.	Jacques Spagnoli	(Switzerland)	20	Lausanne-Sports

== Further in Swiss football ==
- 1935–36 Swiss Cup
- 1935–36 Swiss 1. Liga

== Sources ==
- Switzerland 1935–36 at RSSSF

Preceded by 1934–35	Nationalliga seasons in Switzerland	Succeeded by 1936–37
