= 1936–37 BSC Young Boys season =

BSC Young Boys
1936–37 season
- Chairman: G. Marchand
- Manager: Hans Pulver
- Stadium: Stadion Wankdorf
- Nationalliga: 2nd
- Swiss Cup: Round 2

The 1936–37 season was the 38th season in the history of Berner Sport Club Young Boys. The team played their home games at Stadion Wankdorf in Bern and placed 2nd in the Nationalliga, and was eliminated in the second round of the Swiss Cup.

== Players ==
- Roger Droguet
- Max Horisberger
- Walter Jäggi
- Fritz Lehmann
- Hans Liniger
- Fritz Künzi
- Aldo Poretti
- Christian Sydler
- Vilmos Sipos
- Bacher
- Paul Aebi

== Friendlies ==
Win Draw Loss

11 April 1937 Friendly	Basel	0–1	Young Boys	Basel
			Sydler 75'	Stadium: Landhof; Attendance: 1,000; Referee: Meury

== Competitions ==
=== Overall record ===
Competition	First match	Last match	Starting round	Final position	Record							
Competition	First match	Last match	Starting round	Final position	Pld	W	D	L	GF	GA	GD	Win %
Nationalliga	30 August 1936	6 June 1937	Matchday 1	2nd	24	12	5	7	61	36	+25	50.00
Swiss Cup	4 October 1936	6 December 1936	1st principal round	Round 2	2	2	0	0	9	4	+5	100.00
Total					26	14	5	7	70	40	+30	53.85

Source: Competitions

=== Nationalliga ===
==== League table ====
Pos	Team	Pld	W	D	L	GF	GA	GD	Pts	Qualification or relegation
1	Grasshopper Club	24	15	6	3	68	32	+36	36	Swiss Champions and Swiss Cup winners
2	Young Boys	24	12	5	7	61	36	+25	29	
3	Young Fellows Zürich	24	12	4	8	57	53	+4	28	
4	Luzern	24	11	6	7	44	45	−1	28	
5	Biel-Bienne	24	11	5	8	45	37	+8	27	

Source: rsssf.com
Rules for classification: 1) Points; 2) Goal difference within the league, however with play-off for qualifiers;

==== Matches ====
30 August 1936 Round 1	FC Nordstern Basel	0–2	Young Boys	Basel
				Stadium: Stadion Rankhof; Attendance: 1,200; Referee: (Switzerland) William Bangerter

6 September 1936 Round 2	Young Boys	9–2	FC Lugano	Bern
				Stadium: Stadion Wankdorf; Attendance: 2,500; Referee: (Switzerland) Karl Wunderlin

13 September 1936 Round 3	St. Gallen	0–1	Young Boys	St. Gallen
				Stadium: Espenmoos; Attendance: 1,500; Referee: (Switzerland) Walter Jordan

27 September 1936 Round 4	Young Boys	4–1	Servette	Bern
				Stadium: Stadion Wankdorf; Attendance: 4,000; Referee: (Switzerland) Felix Herren

11 October 1936 Round 5	Young Fellows Zürich	3–4	Young Boys	Zürich
				Stadium: Letzigrund; Attendance: 6,000; Referee: (Switzerland) Ferdinand Allemann

18 October 1936 Round 6	Luzern	4–2	Young Boys	Lucerne
				Stadium: Stadion Allmend; Attendance: 5,200; Referee: (Switzerland) William Bangerter

15 November 1936 Round 7	Young Boys	3–0	FC La Chaux-de-Fonds	Bern
				Stadium: Stadion Wankdorf; Attendance: 4,000; Referee: (Switzerland) Alfred Spengler

22 November 1936 Round 8	Basel	0–2	Young Boys	Landhof, Basel
14:30		Summary	52' (0:1) Sydler; 67' (0:2) Sipos	Attendance: 4,000; Referee: (Switzerland) Meyer Lausanne

13 December 1936 Round 9	Lausanne-Sports	0–1	Young Boys	Lausanne
				Stadium: Stade olympique de la Pontaise; Attendance: 4,500; Referee: (Switzerland) Albert Feurer

20 December 1936 Round 10	Young Boys	1–1	Grasshopper Club Zürich	Bern
				Stadium: Stadion Wankdorf; Attendance: 8,000; Referee: (Switzerland) Alfred Spengler

27 December 1936 Round 11	FC Bern	1–0	Young Boys	Bern
				Stadium: Stadion Neufeld; Attendance: 7,000; Referee: (Switzerland) Eduard Iseli

3 January 1937 Round 12	Young Boys	4–4	FC Biel-Bienne	Bern
				Stadium: Stadion Wankdorf; Attendance: 4,500; Referee: (Switzerland) Ernest Meyer

10 January 1937 Round 13	Young Boys	1–1	FC Nordstern Basel	Bern
				Stadium: Stadion Wankdorf; Attendance: 4,000; Referee: (Switzerland) Marcel Dupuis

17 January 1937 Round 14	FC Lugano	2–0	Young Boys	Lugano
				Stadium: Campo Marzio; Attendance: 3,000; Referee: (Switzerland) Albert Feurer

24 January 1937 Round 15	Young Boys	7–1	St. Gallen	Bern
				Stadium: Stadion Wankdorf; Attendance: 2,500; Referee: (Switzerland) Eduard Iseli

31 January 1937 Round 16	Servette	1–3	Young Boys	Geneva
				Stadium: Charmilles Stadium; Attendance: 6,000; Referee: (Switzerland) Karl Wunderlin

14 February 1937 Round 17	Young Boys	3–0	Young Fellows Zürich	Bern
				Stadium: Stadion Wankdorf; Attendance: 6,000; Referee: (Switzerland) Ernest Meyer

28 February 1937 Round 18	Young Boys	2–3	Luzern	Bern
				Stadium: Stadion Wankdorf; Attendance: 3,000; Referee: (Switzerland) Albert Feurer

21 March 1937 Round 19	FC La Chaux-de-Fonds	2–5	Young Boys	La Chaux-de-Fonds
				Stadium: Parc des Sports; Attendance: 3,000; Referee: (Switzerland) Ernest Meyer

4 April 1937 Round 20	Young Boys	1–2	Basel	Wankdorf Stadium, Bern
	Aebi 10' (1:0)	Summary	(1:1) Saner; 59' (1:2) Spadini	Attendance: 3,000; Referee: (Switzerland) Dupuis Yverdon

9 May 1937 Round 21	Young Boys	3–3	Lausanne-Sports	Bern
				Stadium: Stadion Wankdorf; Attendance: 3,500; Referee: (Switzerland) Walter Jordan

23 May 1937 Round 22	Grasshopper Club Zürich	2–1	Young Boys	Zürich
				Stadium: Hardturm; Attendance: 10,000; Referee: (Switzerland) Karl Wunderlin

30 May 1937 Round 23	Young Boys	1–2	FC Bern	Bern
	Aldo Poretti 50'		Bärlocher 7'; Tschanz 15'	Stadium: Stadion Wankdorf; Attendance: 3,000; Referee: (Switzerland) Ernest Meyer

6 June 1937 Round 24	FC Biel-Bienne	1–1	Young Boys	Biel/Bienne
	Rahmen 80'		Paul Aebi 15'	Stadium: Stadion Gurzelen; Attendance: 2,000; Referee: (Switzerland) Walter Jordan

=== Swiss Cup ===
4 October 1936 1st principal round	FC Bern	0–3	Young Boys	Bern
				Stadium: Stadion Neufeld

1 November 1936 Round 1	Young Boys	5–1	SC Zofingen	Bern
				Stadium: Stadion Wankdorf

6 December 1936 Round 2	Servette	3–1	Young Boys	Geneva
				Stadium: Charmilles Stadium
