= Gustav Tögel =

Austrian footballer

Personal information
- Date of birth: 24 October 1907
- Date of death: February 1981
- Position: Forward

Senior career*
Years	Team	Apps	(Gls)
–1928	Gersthofer SV		
1928–1930	Floridsdorfer AC		
1930–1934	Vienna		
1934–1937	Young Fellows Zürich		
1937–1938	FC Nancy		

International career
1931	Austria	1	(0)
- * Club domestic league appearances and goals

Gustav Tögel (24 October 1907 – February 1981) was an Austrian international footballer.
