= Marvin Assane =

Chadian footballer (born 1993)

Personal information
- Date of birth: 30 July 1993 (age 33)
- Place of birth: Amiens, France
- Height: 1.83 m (6 ft 0 in)
- Position: Centre-back

Team information
- Current team: Young Fellows Juventus
- Number: 3

Senior career*
Years	Team	Apps	(Gls)
2013–2014	Arras		
2014–2016	Calais	1	(0)
2016–2017	Marck	14	(0)
2017–2019	FC Ailly-sur-Somme Samara		
2019–2020	La Flèche	13	(0)
2020–2022	Engordany	32	(2)
2022–2023	Zürich City SC		
2023–2025	FC Dietikon	32	(2)
2025	FC Rotkreuz	14	(2)
2025–2026	FC Dietikon	15	(0)
2026–	Young Fellows Juventus	1	(0)

International career^{‡}
2022–	Chad	3	(0)
- * Club domestic league appearances and goals as of 1 October 2026 ‡ National team caps and goals as of 11 June 2024

Marvin Assane (born 30 July 1993) is a footballer who plays as a centre-back for Swiss Promotion League club Young Fellows Juventus. Born in France, he represents Chad at international level.

== Early life ==
Assane started playing football at the age of four.

== Career ==
Assane played for the Chad national football team.

== Style of play ==
Assane mainly operates as a defender and started as a left-back before switching to central defender.

== Personal life ==
Assane was born to a Chadian father and a French mother.
