= 1944–45 Swiss 1. Liga =

1. Liga
- Season: 1944–45
- Champions: 1. Liga champions: Schaffhausen; Group West: FC Helvetia Bern; Group Cenral: FC Pratteln; Group South and East: Schaffhausen
- Promoted: Schaffhausen; FC Helvetia Bern
- Relegated: Group West: CA Genève; Group Central: US Bienne-Boujean; Group South and East: Kickers Luzern
- Matches: 3 times 90 and 1 decider plus 3 play-offs

The 1944–45 1. Liga season was the 13th season of the 1. Liga since its creation in 1931. This was the first season of a completely new format in Swiss football.

== Overview ==
=== Preamble ===
In Switzerland during the second world war, sport became an integral part of the "spiritual national defense". This was a political and cultural movement that had already become increasingly important during the late 1930s. Politicians, intellectuals and media professionals had increasingly called for measures to strengthen Switzerland's basic cultural values. Since the Nationalliga games were also considered to be one of the activities that seemed important for maintaining the morale of the population, the military authorities put considerably fewer obstacles in the way of the top players as they had during the previous World War.

=== ASF/SFV ===
Therefore, it came about that the Swiss Football Association (ASF/SFV) expanded themselves. The decision of the extraordinary assembly, held on 9 October 1943 in Lugano, was to double the number of members to 28 clubs for the 1944–45 season. The Nationalliga was divided into two strength classes each with 14 teams. The previous Nationalliga became the Nationalliga A (NLA), while the Nationalliga B (NLB) was newly formed with the 14 best teams of the previous 1. Liga season.

=== Format ===
From this moment, the 1. Liga became the third-tier of the Swiss football league system. It was also increased in size, from 25 clubs in two groups, to new three groups with 10 teams each. The remaining 11 clubs from last season were joined by 19 teams brought up from the next lowest tier. This format would be expanded over the next two seasons by adding one team pro group in both seasons, so that there would be 36 clubs in the division within two seasons. The teams were divided into three regional groups, this season each group with 10 teams. Within each individual group, the teams would play a double round-robin to decide their league position. Two points were awarded for a win and one point was awarded for a draw. The three group winners then contested a play-off round to decide the two promotion slots to the second-tier (NLB). The last placed team in each group was directly relegated to the 2. Liga, which now became the new fourth-tier.

== Group West ==
=== Teams, locations ===
Club	Based in	Canton	Stadium	Capacity
CA Genève	Geneva	Geneva		
FC Central Fribourg	Fribourg	Fribourg	Guintzet	2,000
FC Helvetia Bern	Bern	Bern	Spitalacker, Bern	1,000
FC Montreux-Sports	Montreux	Vaud	Stade de Chailly	1,000
Racing Club Lausanne	Lausanne	Vaud	Centre sportif de la Tuilière	1,000
FC Renens	Renens	Vaud	Zone sportive du Censuy	2,300
FC Sierre	Sierre	Valais	Complexe Ecossia	2,000
FC Sion	Sion	Valais	Parc des sports (Tourbillon)	8,000
FC Thun	Thun	Bern	Stadion Lachen	10,350
Vevey Sports	Vevey	Vaud	Stade de Copet	4,000

=== Final league table ===
Pos	Team	Pld	W	D	L	GF	GA	GD	Pts	Qualification or relegation
1	FC Helvetia Bern	18	13	2	3	35	23	+12	28	To promotion play-off
2	FC Thun	18	11	4	3	40	25	+15	26	
3	Vevey Sports	18	9	5	4	45	22	+23	23	
4	Central Fribourg	18	8	6	4	37	23	+14	22	
5	FC Montreux-Sports	18	7	6	5	30	36	−6	20	
6	FC Sierre	18	8	1	9	35	29	+6	17	
7	Racing Club Lausanne	18	6	3	9	25	26	−1	15	
8	FC Sion	18	5	4	9	28	31	−3	14	
9	FC Renens	18	5	2	11	27	49	−22	12	
10	CA Genève	18	0	3	15	13	51	−38	3	Relegation to 2. Liga

Source: RSSSF
Rules for classification: 1) Points; 2) Goal difference within the league, but decider play-off for qualifiers.

== Group Central ==
=== Teams, locations ===
Club	Based in	Canton	Stadium	Capacity
US Bienne-Boujean	Biel/Bienne	Bern		
FC Birsfelden	Birsfelden	Basel-Landschaft	Sternenfeld	9,400
FC Concordia Basel	Basel	Basel-Stadt	Stadion Rankhof	7,000
SC Kleinhüningen	Basel	Basel-Stadt	Sportplatz Schorenmatte	300
FC Le Locle	Le Locle	Neuchâtel	Installation sportive - Jeanneret	3,142
FC Moutier	Moutier	Bern	Stade de Chalière	5,000
FC Pratteln	Pratteln	Basel-Landschaft	In den Sandgruben	5,000
SC Schöftland	Schöftland	Aargau	Sportanlage Rütimatten	2,000
FC Tavannes/Tramelan	Tramelan	Bern	Bâloise Stadium / (Allianz Suisse Stadium)	1,500 / (1,800)
SC Zofingen	Zofingen	Aargau	Sportanlagen Trinermatten	2,000

=== Final league table ===
Pos	Team	Pld	W	D	L	GF	GA	GD	Pts	Qualification or relegation
1	FC Pratteln	18	9	6	3	46	27	+19	24	Decider for group winners
2	FC Concordia Basel	18	10	4	4	40	30	+10	24	Decider for group winners
3	SC Schöftland	18	9	2	7	45	35	+10	20	
4	FC Birsfelden	18	7	5	6	36	35	+1	19	
5	FC Moutier	18	6	6	6	45	41	+4	18	
6	SC Zofingen	18	7	3	8	43	39	+4	17	
7	FC Le Locle	18	5	7	6	33	43	−10	17	
8	SC Kleinhüningen	18	6	4	8	40	42	−2	16	
9	FC Tavannes/Tramelan	18	5	5	8	37	45	−8	15	
10	US Bienne-Boujean	18	4	2	12	30	58	−28	10	Relegation to 2. Liga

Source: RSSSF
Rules for classification: 1) Points; 2) Goal difference within the league, but decider play-off for qualifiers.

=== Decider for group winners ===
The decider match for the group championship was played on 24 June 1945 in Basel

Team 1	Score	Team 2
FC Pratteln	1–0	Concordia

FC Pratteln win and advance to the promotion play-offs. Concordia remain in the division.

== Group South and East ==
=== Teams, locations ===
Club	Based in	Canton	Stadium	Capacity
FC Adliswil	Adliswil	Zürich	Tüfi	1,000
FC Altstetten (Zürich)	Altstetten	Zürich	Buchlern	1,000
FC Arbon	Arbon	Thurgau	Stacherholz	1,000
FC Blue Stars Zürich	Zürich	Zürich	Hardhof	1,000
FC Chiasso	Chiasso	Ticino	Stadio Comunale Riva IV	4,000
FC Kickers Luzern	Lucerne	Lucerne	Stadion Auf Tribschen	2,950
FC Red Star Zürich	Zürich	Zürich	Allmend Brunau	2,000
FC Schaffhausen	Schaffhausen	Schaffhausen	Stadion Breite	7,300
FC Uster	Uster	Zürich	Sportanlage Buchholz	7,000
FC Winterthur	Winterthur	Zürich	Schützenwiese	8,550

=== Final league table ===
Pos	Team	Pld	W	D	L	GF	GA	GD	Pts	Qualification or relegation
1	FC Schaffhausen	18	15	2	1	50	22	+28	32	To promotion play-off
2	FC Chiasso	18	11	2	5	36	16	+20	24	
3	FC Winterthur	18	11	0	7	35	31	+4	22	
4	FC Blue Stars Zürich	17	8	4	5	37	21	+16	20	
5	FC Altstetten (Zürich)	18	9	1	8	36	35	+1	19	
6	FC Adliswil	18	6	4	8	32	35	−3	16	
7	FC Uster	17	6	3	8	32	32	0	15	
8	FC Arbon	18	6	3	9	39	40	−1	15	
9	FC Red Star Zürich	18	6	1	11	27	46	−19	13	
10	FC Kickers Luzern	18	0	2	16	20	66	−46	2	Relegation to 2. Liga

Source: RSSSF
Rules for classification: 1) Points; 2) Goal difference within the league, but decider play-off for qualifiers.

== Promotion ==
The three group winners played a single round-robin to decide the overall championship and the two promotion slots. The promotion play-offs were held on 17 June, 1 and 8 July 1945.

=== Promotion play-off ===
Pos	Team	Pld	W	D	L	GF	GA	GD	Pts	FCS	HEL	PRA
1	FC Schaffhausen	2	2	0	0	8	2	+6	4	—	6–2	—
2	FC Helvetia Bern	2	1	0	1	3	6	−3	2	—	—	1–0
3	FC Pratteln	2	0	0	2	0	3	−3	0	0–2	—	—

Source: RSSSF
Rules for classification: 1) Points; 2) Head-to-head 3) Decider.

FC Schaffhausen became overall 1. Liga Champions and together with runners-up FC Helvetia Bern were promoted to 1945–46 Nationalliga B. FC Pratteln remained in the division for the next season.

== Further in Swiss football ==
- 1944–45 Nationalliga A
- 1944–45 Nationalliga B
- 1944–45 Swiss Cup

== Sources ==
- Switzerland 1944–45 at RSSSF

Preceded by 1943–44	Seasons in Swiss 1. Liga	Succeeded by 1945–46
