= 1943–44 Swiss 1. Liga =

1. Liga
- Season: 1943–44
- Champions: 1. Liga champions: Bellinzona; Group West winners: CS International Genève; Group East winners: Bellinzona
- Promoted: Bellinzona
- Relegated: none
- Matches: 156 (West), 132 (East) plus 2 play-offs

The 1943–44 1. Liga season was the 12th season of the 1. Liga since its creation in 1931. At this time, the 1. Liga was the second-tier of the Swiss football league system, next season it would become the third-tier.

== Overview ==
=== Preamble ===
In Switzerland during the second world war period, sport became an integral part of the "spiritual national defense". This was a political and cultural movement that had already become increasingly important during the late 1930s. Politicians, intellectuals and media professionals had increasingly called for measures to strengthen Switzerland's basic cultural values. Since the Nationalliga games were also considered to be one of the activities that seemed important for maintaining the morale of the population, the military authorities put considerably fewer obstacles in the way of the top players and leading clubs as they had during the previous World War.

=== ASF/SFV ===
Therefore, it came about that the Swiss Football Association (ASF/SFV) expanded themselves. The decision of the extraordinary assembly, held on 9 October 1943 in Lugano, was to double the number of members to 28 clubs for the 1944–45 season. The Nationalliga was then to be divided into two strength classes each with 14 teams. The top-tier would become the Nationalliga A (NLA) and a new second-tier, called Nationalliga B (NLB), would be formed with the 14 best teams of this 1. Liga season.

=== Format ===
There were 25 clubs competing in the 1. Liga this season. The teams were divided into two regional groups, the eastern group with 12 teams, the western group with 13 teams. Within each group, the teams would play a double round-robin to decide their league position. Two points were awarded for a win and one point was awarded for a draw. The two group winners then contested a play-off to decide the overall 1. Liga championship and the one promotion-slot to the top-tier. The best seven placed teams in each group would be assigned to the newly created NLB. The remaining teams would remain in the 1. Liga, which in the next season would become the third-tier with three groups, each with 10 clubs. In this season there was no relegations to the 2. Liga, which would become the new fourth-tier.

== Group West ==
=== Teams, locations ===
| Club | Based in | Canton | Stadium | Capacity |
|---|---|---|---|---|
| FC Bern | Bern | Bern | Stadion Neufeld | 14,000 |
| US Bienne-Boujean | Biel/Bienne | Bern | | |
| CA Genève | Geneva | Geneva | | |
| SC Derendingen | Derendingen | Solothurn | Heidenegg | 1,500 |
| FC Étoile-Sporting | La Chaux-de-Fonds | Neuchâtel | Les Foulets / Terrain des Eplatures | 1,000 / 500 |
| FC Fribourg | Fribourg | Fribourg | Stade Universitaire | 9,000 |
| FC Helvetia Bern | Bern | Bern | Spitalacker, Bern | 1,000 |
| CS International Genève | Geneva | Geneva | | |
| FC Montreux-Sports | Montreux | Vaud | Stade de Chailly | 1,000 |
| FC Renens | Renens | Vaud | Zone sportive du Censuy | 2,300 |
| FC Solothurn | Solothurn | Solothurn | Stadion FC Solothurn | 6,750 |
| Urania Genève Sport | Genève | Geneva | Stade de Frontenex | 4,000 |
| Vevey Sports | Vevey | Vaud | Stade de Copet | 4,000 |

=== Final league table ===
| Pos | Team | Pld | W | D | L | GF | GA | GD | Pts | Qualification or relegation |
|---|---|---|---|---|---|---|---|---|---|---|
| 1 | CS International Genève | 24 | 14 | 5 | 5 | 46 | 21 | +25 | 33 | To promotion play-off |
| 2 | Urania Genève Sport | 24 | 12 | 8 | 4 | 40 | 23 | +17 | 32 | To new NLB |
| 3 | FC Fribourg | 24 | 13 | 4 | 7 | 51 | 34 | +17 | 30 | To new NLB |
| 4 | FC Bern | 24 | 13 | 3 | 8 | 57 | 35 | +22 | 29 | To new NLB |
| 5 | FC Solothurn | 24 | 10 | 9 | 5 | 42 | 26 | +16 | 29 | To new NLB |
| 6 | SC Derendingen | 24 | 11 | 7 | 6 | 40 | 26 | +14 | 29 | To new NLB |
| 7 | FC Étoile-Sporting | 24 | 10 | 5 | 9 | 34 | 32 | +2 | 25 | To new NLB |
| 8 | FC Helvetia Bern | 24 | 8 | 8 | 8 | 31 | 42 | −11 | 24 | Remain in 1. Liga |
| 9 | US Bienne-Boujean | 24 | 7 | 6 | 11 | 28 | 42 | −14 | 20 | Remain in 1. Liga |
| 10 | Vevey Sports | 24 | 5 | 9 | 10 | 23 | 36 | −13 | 19 | Remain in 1. Liga |
| 11 | FC Montreux-Sports | 24 | 7 | 4 | 13 | 41 | 55 | −14 | 18 | Remain in 1. Liga |
| 12 | CA Genève | 24 | 3 | 6 | 15 | 23 | 48 | −25 | 12 | Remain in 1. Liga |
| 13 | FC Renens | 24 | 4 | 4 | 16 | 28 | 64 | −36 | 12 | Remain in 1. Liga |

Source: RSSSF
Rules for classification: 1) Points; 2) Goal difference within the league, but decider play-off for qualifiers.

== Group East ==
=== Teams, locations ===
| Club | Based in | Canton | Stadium | Capacity |
|---|---|---|---|---|
| FC Aarau | Aarau | Aargau | Stadion Brügglifeld | 9,240 |
| AC Bellinzona | Bellinzona | Ticino | Stadio Comunale Bellinzona | 5,000 |
| FC Birsfelden | Birsfelden | Basel-Landschaft | Sternenfeld | 9,400 |
| SC Brühl | St. Gallen | St. Gallen | Paul-Grüninger-Stadion | 4,200 |
| FC Chiasso | Chiasso | Ticino | Stadio Comunale Riva IV | 4,000 |
| FC Concordia Basel | Basel | Basel-Stadt | Stadion Rankhof | 7,000 |
| FC Kickers Luzern | Lucerne | Lucerne | Stadion Auf Tribschen | 2,950 |
| SC Kleinhüningen | Basel | Basel-Stadt | Sportplatz Schorenmatte | 300 |
| FC Locarno | Locarno | Ticino | Stadio comunale Lido | 5,000 |
| FC Nordstern Basel | Basel | Basel-Stadt | Rankhof | 7,600 |
| US Pro Daro | Bellinzona | Ticino | Campo Geretta / Stadio Comunale Bellinzona | 500 / 5,000 |
| Zug | Zug | Zug | Herti Allmend Stadion | 6,000 |

=== Final league table ===
| Pos | Team | Pld | W | D | L | GF | GA | GD | Pts | Qualification or relegation |
|---|---|---|---|---|---|---|---|---|---|---|
| 1 | AC Bellinzona | 22 | 17 | 4 | 1 | 74 | 18 | +56 | 38 | To promotion play-off |
| 2 | FC Aarau | 22 | 14 | 3 | 5 | 60 | 30 | +30 | 31 | To new NLB |
| 3 | FC Locarno | 22 | 13 | 4 | 5 | 45 | 26 | +19 | 30 | To new NLB |
| 4 | FC Nordstern Basel | 22 | 13 | 2 | 7 | 47 | 34 | +13 | 28 | To new NLB |
| 5 | SC Brühl | 22 | 11 | 5 | 6 | 47 | 36 | +11 | 27 | To new NLB |
| 6 | SC Zug | 22 | 9 | 5 | 8 | 35 | 35 | 0 | 23 | To new NLB |
| 7 | US Pro Daro | 22 | 10 | 1 | 11 | 34 | 44 | −10 | 21 | To new NLB |
| 8 | SC Kleinhüningen | 22 | 8 | 3 | 11 | 41 | 54 | −13 | 19 | Remain in 1. Liga |
| 9 | FC Birsfelden | 22 | 5 | 4 | 13 | 34 | 52 | −18 | 14 | Remain in 1. Liga |
| 10 | FC Chiasso | 22 | 4 | 6 | 12 | 30 | 50 | −20 | 14 | Remain in 1. Liga |
| 11 | FC Kickers Luzern | 22 | 3 | 4 | 15 | 31 | 66 | −35 | 10 | Remain in 1. Liga |
| 12 | FC Concordia Basel | 22 | 2 | 5 | 15 | 27 | 60 | −33 | 9 | Remain in 1. Liga |

Source: RSSSF
Rules for classification: 1) Points; 2) Goal difference within the league, but decider play-off for qualifiers.

== Promotion ==
The two group winners played a two legged tie for the title of 1. Liga champions and for promotion to the 1944–45 Nationalliga A. The games were played on 18 and 25 June 1944.

=== Promotion play-off ===
| Team 1 | Score | Team 2 |
|---|---|---|
| Bellinzona | 2–2 | International Genève |
| International Genève | 1–3 | Bellinzona |

Bellinzona won, were 1. Liga champions and were promoted to the top-tier for the 1944–45 Nationalliga A season. International Genève were assigned to the new NLB.

== Further in Swiss football ==
- 1943–44 Nationalliga
- 1943–44 Swiss Cup

== Sources ==
- Switzerland 1943–44 at RSSSF

| Preceded by 1942–43 | Seasons in Swiss 1. Liga | Succeeded by 1944–45 |
