= Fritz Wagner (footballer) =

Swiss footballer (1913-1987)

Personal information
- Full name: Friedrich Wagner
- Date of birth: 21 December 1913
- Date of death: 9 September 1987 (aged 73)
- Position: Forward

Senior career*
Years	Team	Apps	(Gls)
1932–1936	FC La Chaux-de-Fonds		
1936–1939	Grasshopper Club Zürich		
1939–1940	FC La Chaux-de-Fonds		

International career
1936–1940	Switzerland	9	(2)
- * Club domestic league appearances and goals

Friedrich Wagner, best known as Fritz Wagner, (21 December 1913 – 9 September 1987) was a Swiss footballer who played for Switzerland in the 1938 FIFA World Cup. He also played for Grasshopper Club Zürich.
