= 1936–37 Nationalliga =

Swiss football season

Nationalliga
- Season: 1936–37
- Dates: 30 August 1936 to 6 June 1937
- Champions: Grasshopper Club
- Relegated: La Chaux-de-Fonds; St. Gallen
- Matches: 144
- Top goalscorer: Alessandro Frigerio (Young Fellows); 23 goals

The following is the summary of the Swiss National League in the 1936–37 football season. This was the 40th season of top-tier football in Switzerland.

== Overview ==
For this season, the Swiss Football Association (ASF/SFV) had been reduced from 14 to 13 member clubs in the top-tier and 24 clubs in the second-tier. This was one Nationalliga team fewer than in the previous season, this because the league format was being modified. Next season would see the number of teams in the top-tier again reduced to just 12 teams. From then onwards the format would remain unchanged.

The 13 top-tier teams played a double round-robin to decide their league table positions. Two points were awarded for a win and one point was awarded for a draw. The first placed team at the end of the season would be awarded the Swiss championship title and the last two placed teams would be relegated to the 1937–38 1. Liga. As only one team from the second tier 1. Liga would achieve promotion this season, the ASF/SFV would complete their modification of the Nationalliga for next season.

== Nationalliga ==
The league season began with the first matchday on 30 August 1936 and was concluded with the last round on 6 June 1937.

=== Teams, locations ===
Team	Based in	Canton	Stadium	Capacity
FC Basel	Basel	Basel-Stadt	Landhof	4,000
FC Bern	Bern	Bern	Stadion Neufeld	14,000
FC Biel-Bienne	Biel/Bienne	Bern	Stadion Gurzelen	5,500
Grasshopper Club Zürich	Zürich	Zürich	Hardturm	20,000
FC La Chaux-de-Fonds	La Chaux-de-Fonds	Neuchâtel	Centre Sportif de la Charrière	12,700
FC Lausanne-Sport	Lausanne	Vaud	Pontaise	30,000
FC Lugano	Lugano	Ticino	Cornaredo Stadium	6,330
FC Luzern	Lucerne	Lucerne	Stadion Allmend	25,000
FC Nordstern Basel	Basel	Basel-Stadt	Rankhof	7,600
Servette FC	Geneva	Geneva	Stade des Charmilles	27,000
FC St. Gallen	St. Gallen	St. Gallen	Espenmoos	11,000
BSC Young Boys	Bern	Bern	Wankdorf Stadium	56,000
FC Young Fellows	Zürich	Zürich	Utogrund	2,850

=== Final league table ===
Pos	Team	Pld	W	D	L	GF	GA	GD	Pts	Qualification or relegation
1	Grasshopper Club	24	15	6	3	68	32	+36	36	Swiss Champions and Swiss Cup winners
2	Young Boys	24	12	5	7	61	36	+25	29	
3	Young Fellows Zürich	24	12	4	8	57	53	+4	28	
4	Luzern	24	11	6	7	44	45	−1	28	
5	Biel-Bienne	24	11	5	8	45	37	+8	27	
6	Lugano	24	11	4	9	57	54	+3	26	
7	Servette	24	11	3	10	55	47	+8	25	
8	Lausanne-Sport	24	10	3	11	56	40	+16	23	
9	Bern	24	8	6	10	42	44	−2	22	
10	Nordstern Basel	24	7	7	10	42	50	−8	21	
11	Basel	24	8	4	12	30	42	−12	20	To play-out against relegation
12	La Chaux-de-Fonds	24	9	2	13	54	61	−7	20	To play-out against relegation
13	St. Gallen	24	2	3	19	32	102	−70	7	Relegated to 1937–38 1. Liga

Source: rsssf.com
Rules for classification: 1) Points; 2) Goal difference within the league, however with play-off for qualifiers;

As Grasshopper Club had already won the Swiss Cup three months earlier, on 29 March, the team won the domestic Double in this season. This was the clubs eighth league title and their second Double to this date.

=== Results ===
Home \ Away	BAS	BER	BB	CDF	GCZ	LS	LUG	LUZ	NOR	SER	STG	YB	YFZ
Basel		2–2	0–5	3–2	2–0	0–2	3–3	5–1	1–1	2–1	1–0	0–2	2–1
Bern	1–0		1–1	3–7	2–3	1–0	0–2	1–1	1–1	2–2	10–1	1–0	4–1
Biel-Bienne	2–0	3–0		3–0	0–1	1–3	4–1	0–1	2–1	2–1	4–2	1–1	0–4
La Chaux-de-Fonds	0–0	0–1	3–0		2–4	4–2	4–2	1–1	6–0	3–1	2–3	2–5	1–0
Grasshopper Club	4–0	2–0	6–1	5–1		5–2	6–2	1–1	4–1	2–0	1–1	2–1	6–0
Lausanne-Sports	3–0	2–0	0–1	4–3	2–3		3–1	1–0	0–1	1–1	15–2	0–1	3–2
Lugano	2–1	0–3	2–0	8–0	1–1	2–1		2–0	2–1	4–0	6–0	2–0	2–2
Luzern	2–1	1–0	2–2	3–1	3–2	1–0	1–1		1–2	2–1	6–1	4–2	2–4
Nordstern Basel	1–3	6–2	0–3	4–2	1–1	2–2	6–3	1–1		2–3	2–1	0–2	2–2
Servette	3–1	3–1	2–1	2–6	2–0	2–0	3–2	7–1	3–1		8–0	1–3	3–4
St. Gallen	2–1	2–2	1–4	1–2	4–4	0–5	1–2	2–4	2–4	2–4		0–1	1–4
Young Boys	1–2	1–2	4–4	3–0	1–1	3–3	9–2	2–3	1–1	4–1	7–1		3–0
Young Fellows	1–0	3–2	1–1	3–2	2–4	4–2	5–3	5–2	2–1	1–1	3–2	3–4	

Source: rsssf.com
Legend: Blue = home team win; Yellow = draw; Red = away team win.

=== Play-out against relegation ===
The twelfth position was the relegation slot. Because Basel and La Chaux-de-Fonds ended the season level on points in joint eleventh/twelfth position, a play-out against relegation was required. The play-out took place on 13 June 1937 at the Wankdorf Stadium in Bern.

13 June 1937
Play-out

Basel	1–1 (a.e.t.)	La Chaux-de-Fonds
Weber 99' (1:1)	Summary	95' (0:1) Bösch

Wankdorf Stadium, Bern
Attendance: 2,500
Referee: (Switzerland) Spengler Olten

Because the match ended in a draw after extra time and since practices such as penalty shootouts or the "golden goal" were still unknown at the time, a replay was required. The replay took place at the Stadion Neufeld in Bern one week later.

20 June 1937
17:30
Replay

Basel	1–0	La Chaux-de-Fonds
Spadini 32' (1:0)	Summary

Neufeld, Bern
Attendance: 4,000
Referee: (Switzerland) Hans Wüthrich Bern

Basel won and remained in the division for the next season. La Chaux-de-Fonds were relegated to 1937–38 1. Liga.

=== Topscorers ===
Rank	Player	Nat.	Goals	Club
1.	Alessandro Frigerio	(Switzerland)	23	Young Fellows
2.	Willy Jäggi	(Switzerland)	21	Lausanne-Sports
2.	István Grósz	(Hungary)	19	Servette
4.	Xam Abegglen	(Switzerland)	18	Grasshopper Club
4.	Albert Büche	(Switzerland)	18	Nordstern Basel
4.	Eugen "Genia" Walaschek	(Switzerland)	18	Servette
7.	Aldo Poretti	(Switzerland)	15	Young Boys
7.	Stefanovic	(Socialist Federal Republic of Yugoslavia)	15	Lugano

== Further in Swiss football ==
- 1936–37 Swiss Cup
- 1936–37 Swiss 1. Liga

== Sources ==
- Switzerland 1936–37 at RSSSF

Preceded by 1935–36	Nationalliga seasons in Switzerland	Succeeded by 1937–38
