= Paul Aeby =

Swiss footballer (1910–?)

Personal information
- Date of birth: 10 September 1910
- Place of birth: Fribourg, Switzerland
- Position: Forward

Senior career*
Years	Team	Apps	(Gls)
1936–1939	BSC Young Boys		
1939–1942	FC Grenchen		
1942–1947	FC Bern 1894		

International career
1936–1946	Switzerland	20	(4)
- * Club domestic league appearances and goals

Paul Aeby (born 10 September 1910 — ?) was a Swiss footballer who played for Switzerland in the 1938 FIFA World Cup. He also played for BSC Young Boys, FC Grenchen, and FC Bern 1894. He was Georges Aeby's elder brother.
