= 1936–37 Swiss 1. Liga =

1. Liga
- Season: 1936–37
- Champions: 1. Liga champions: Grenchen; Group West winners: Grenchen; Group East winners: Zürich
- Promoted: Grenchen
- Relegated: FC Olten; Fribourg; Kreuzlingen; FC Oerlikon
- Matches: twice 132 and 1 decider plus 2 play-offs total: 267 matches

The 1936–37 1. Liga season was the 6th season of the 1. Liga since its creation in 1931. At this time, the 1. Liga was the second-tier of the Swiss football league system.

== Overview ==
There were 24 clubs that competed in the 1. Liga this season. They were divided into two regional groups, each with 12 teams. The teams in each group played a double round-robin to decide their league position. Two points were awarded for a win and one point was awarded for a draw. Both group winners then contested a play-off round to decide the championship and promotion to the top-tier Nationalliga. The two last placed team in each group were directly relegated to the 2. Liga (third tier).

== Group West ==
=== Teams, locations ===
Club	Based in	Canton	Stadium	Capacity
FC Aarau	Aarau	Aargau	Stadion Brügglifeld	9,240
FC Cantonal Neuchâtel	Neuchâtel	Neuchâtel	Stade de la Maladière	25,500
FC Concordia Yverdon	Yverdon-les-Bains	Vaud	Stade Municipal	6,600
FC Fribourg	Fribourg	Fribourg	Stade Universitaire	9,000
FC Grenchen	Grenchen	Solothurn	Stadium Brühl	15,100
FC Monthey	Monthey	Valais	Stade Philippe Pottier	1,800
FC Montreux-Sports	Montreux	Vaud	Stade de Chailly	1,000
FC Olten	Olten	Solothurn	Sportanlagen Kleinholz	8,000
FC Porrentruy	Porrentruy	Jura	Stade du Tirage	4,226
FC Solothurn	Solothurn	Solothurn	Stadion FC Solothurn	6,750
Urania Genève Sport	Genève	Geneva	Stade de Frontenex	4,000
Vevey Sports	Vevey	Vaud	Stade de Copet	4,000

=== Final league table ===
Pos	Team	Pld	W	D	L	GF	GA	GD	Pts	Qualification or relegation
1	FC Grenchen	22	16	3	3	71	26	+45	35	To decider for group winners
2	Vevey Sports	22	16	3	3	55	31	+24	35	To decider for group winners
3	FC Cantonal Neuchâtel	22	12	5	5	63	42	+21	29	
4	FC Aarau	22	12	2	8	65	32	+33	26	
5	FC Concordia Yverdon	22	9	5	8	38	38	0	23	
6	Urania Genève Sport	22	9	5	8	36	45	−9	23	
7	FC Montreux-Sports	22	8	6	8	49	48	+1	22	
8	FC Monthey	22	8	3	11	45	41	+4	19	
9	FC Solothurn	22	7	5	10	47	51	−4	19	
10	FC Porrentruy	22	7	5	10	31	57	−26	19	
11	FC Olten	22	4	3	15	22	61	−39	11	Relegation to 2. Liga
12	FC Fribourg	22	1	1	20	29	79	−50	3	Relegation to 2. Liga

Source: RSSSF
Rules for classification: 1) Points; 2) Goal difference within the league, but decider play-off for qualifiers.

=== Decider for group winners ===
Because Grenchen and Vevey Sports finished level on points, a decider for first place and group winner was required. The decider took place on 30 May in Biel/Bienne.

Team 1	Score	Team 2
Grenchen	2–1	Vevey Sports

Grenchen won and became group winners, therefore they advanced to the play-off for the 1. Liga championship and promotion.

== Group East ==
=== Teams, locations ===
Club	Based in	Canton	Stadium	Capacity
AC Bellinzona	Bellinzona	Ticino	Stadio Comunale Bellinzona	5,000
FC Blue Stars Zürich	Zürich	Zürich	Hardhof	1,000
SC Brühl	St. Gallen	St. Gallen	Paul-Grüninger-Stadion	4,200
FC Chiasso	Chiasso	Ticino	Stadio Comunale Riva IV	4,000
FC Concordia Basel	Basel	Basel-Stadt	Stadion Rankhof	7,000
SC Juventus Zürich	Zürich	Zürich	Utogrund	2,850
FC Kreuzlingen	Kreuzlingen	Thurgau	Sportplatz Hafenareal	1,200
FC Locarno	Locarno	Ticino	Stadio comunale Lido	5,000
FC Oerlikon	Oerlikon (Zürich)	Zürich	Sportanlage Neudorf	1,000
FC Schaffhausen	Schaffhausen	Schaffhausen	Stadion Breite	7,300
FC Winterthur	Winterthur	Zürich	Schützenwiese	8,550
FC Zürich	Zürich	Zürich	Letzigrund	25,000

=== Final league table ===
Pos	Team	Pld	W	D	L	GF	GA	GD	Pts	Qualification or relegation
1	FC Zürich	22	14	3	5	49	27	+22	31	To promotion play-off
2	SC Brühl	22	14	1	7	60	31	+29	29	
3	FC Blue Stars Zürich	22	12	4	6	48	33	+15	28	
4	SC Juventus Zürich	22	10	5	7	42	36	+6	25	
5	AC Bellinzona	22	10	5	7	43	38	+5	25	
6	FC Locarno	22	10	3	9	38	32	+6	23	
7	FC Winterthur	22	7	6	9	42	51	−9	20	
8	FC Chiasso	22	9	2	11	38	48	−10	20	
9	FC Concordia Basel	22	8	3	11	40	46	−6	19	
10	FC Schaffhausen	22	7	5	10	29	38	−9	19	
11	FC Kreuzlingen	22	6	6	10	23	36	−13	18	Relegation to 2. Liga
12	FC Oerlikon	22	2	3	17	26	62	−36	7	Relegation to 2. Liga

Source: RSSSF
Rules for classification: 1) Points; 2) Goal difference within the league, but decider play-off for qualifiers.

== Promotion ==
The two group winners played a two legged tie for the title of 1. Liga champions and for promotion to the 1937–38 Nationalliga. The games were played on 6 and 13 June 1937.

=== Promotion play-off ===
Team 1	Score	Team 2
Zürich	1–2	Grenchen
Grenchen	6–0	Zürich

Grenchen won by two games to nil, became 1. Liga champions and were promoted. Zürich remain in the division for the next season.

== Further in Swiss football ==
- 1937–38 Nationalliga
- 1937–38 Swiss Cup

== Sources ==
- Switzerland 1936–37 at RSSSF

Preceded by 1935–36	Seasons in Swiss 1. Liga	Succeeded by 1937–38
