= Georges Aeby =

Swiss footballer (1913-1999)

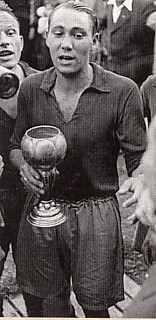
- Aeby in 1940

Personal information
- Date of birth: 21 September 1913
- Place of birth: Fribourg, Switzerland
- Date of death: 15 December 1999 (aged 86)
- Position: Forward

Senior career*
Years	Team	Apps	(Gls)
1930–1933	FC Biel-Bienne		
1933–1942	Servette FC		
1942–1949	FC Lausanne-Sport		
1949–1952	Urania Genève Sport		

International career
1939–1946	Switzerland	39	(13)
- * Club domestic league appearances and goals

Georges Aeby (21 September 1913 – 15 December 1999) was a Swiss footballer who played for Switzerland in the 1938 FIFA World Cup. He also played for FC Biel-Bienne, Servette FC, FC Lausanne-Sport, and Urania Genève Sport. He was Paul Aeby's younger brother.
