= Eugen Walaschek =

Swiss footballer (1917-2007)

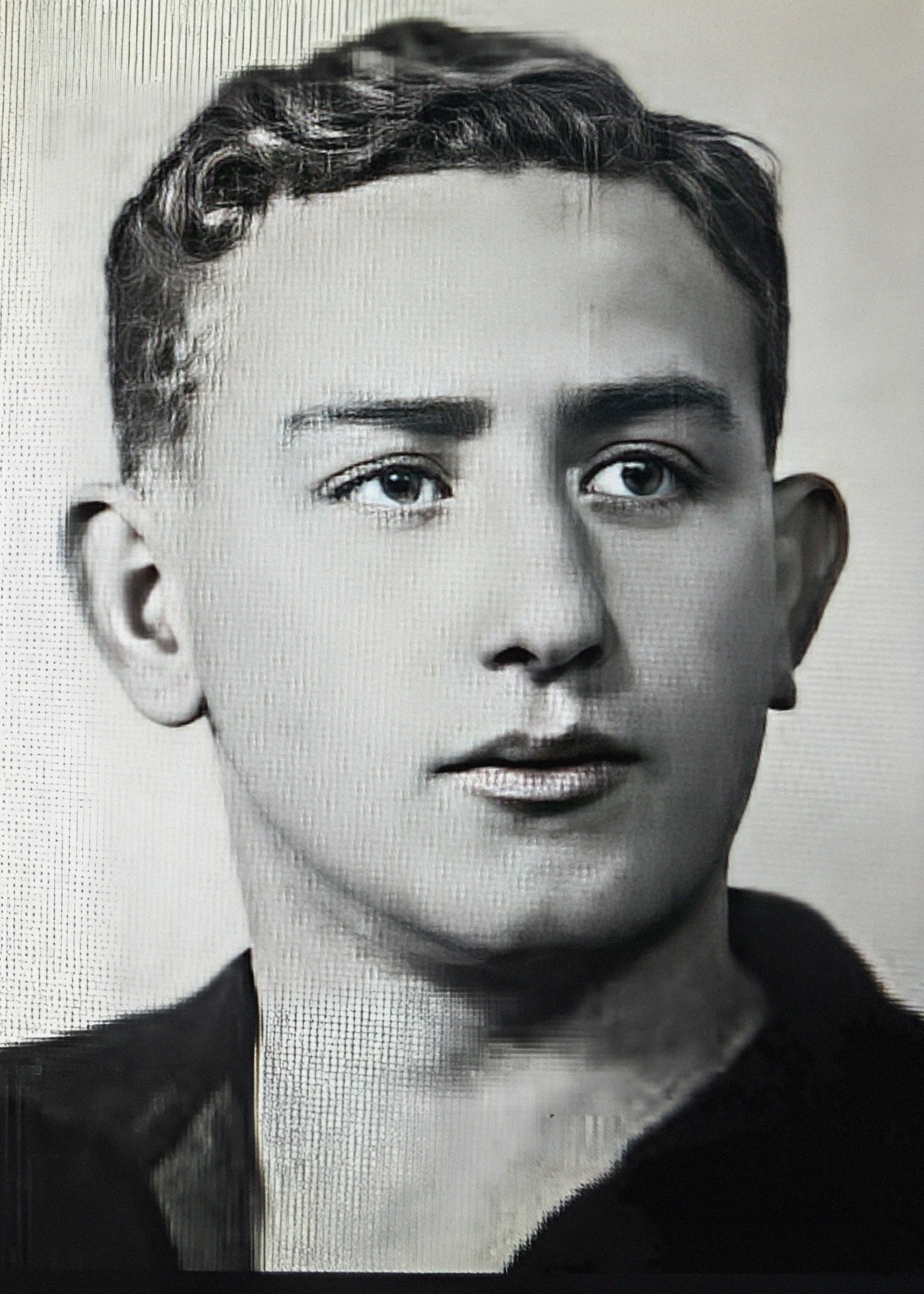

Personal information
- Date of birth: 20 June 1917
- Place of birth: Moscow, Russia
- Date of death: 22 March 2007 (aged 89)
- Position: Striker

Senior career*
Years	Team	Apps	(Gls)
1935–1943	Servette FC		
1943–1948	BSC Young Boys		
1949–1951	FC Étoile-Sporting		

International career
	Switzerland	27	(4)

Managerial career
- 1951–1952: EF La Chaux de Fonds
- 1953–1961: Urania Genève
- * Club domestic league appearances and goals

Eugen "Genia" Walaschek (20 June 1917 – 22 March 2007), was a Swiss footballer. He played for Servette Genf and the Switzerland national football team, for whom he appeared in the 1938 FIFA World Cup, scoring a goal in their first-round victory over Nazi Germany. He coached EF La Chaux de Fonds and Urania Genève.
