= SC Young Fellows Juventus =

Swiss football club

Young Fellows Juventus
- Full name: Sportclub Young Fellows Juventus
- Founded: 1992; 34 years ago
- Ground: Utogrund, Zurich, Switzerland
- Capacity: 2,850
- Chairman: Piero Bauert
- Manager: Danijel Borilovic
- League: 1. Liga Classic
- 2024–25: Group 3, 2nd of 16
| Home colours | Away colours |

Sportclub Young Fellows Juventus is a professional Swiss football club based in Zurich. It was founded in 1992 following a merger between Young Fellows Zürich (established in 1903) and Società Calcistica Italiana Juventus Zurigo (1922). The team currently play in the 1. Liga Classic, the fourth tier of Swiss football.

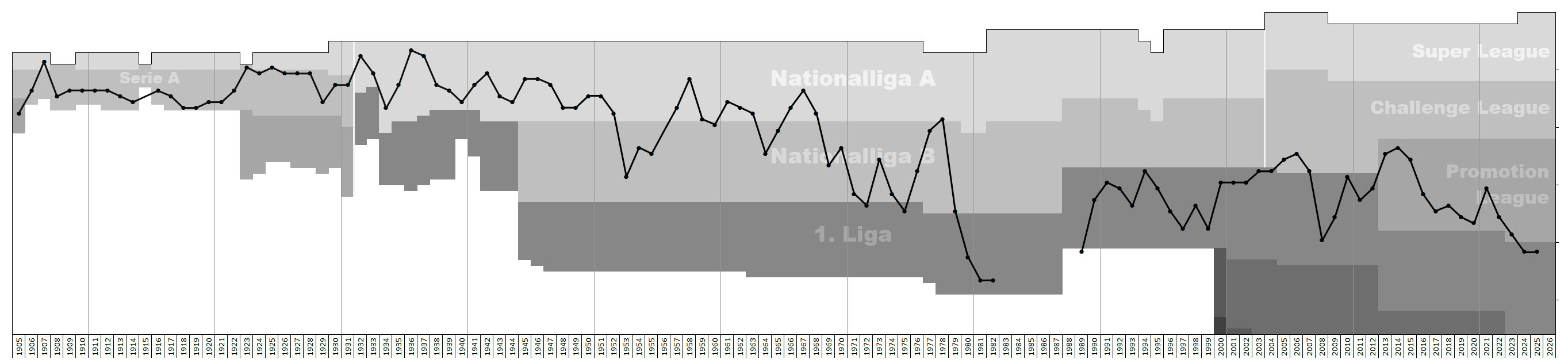
Chart of SC Young Fellows table positions in the Swiss football league system

== Honours ==
- Swiss Cup
  - Winners (1): 1935–36 (as Young Fellows Zürich)

== Current squad ==
As of 20 September, 2026. Note: Flags indicate national team as defined under FIFA eligibility rules; some limited exceptions apply. Players may hold more than one non-FIFA nationality.

| No. | Pos. | Nation | Player |
|---|---|---|---|
| 1 | GK | FRA | Geraldo Bina |
| 2 | DF | CHA | Marvin Assane |
| 3 | DF | SRB | Aleksandar Cvetković |
| 4 | MF | SUI | Zenel Hasani |
| 5 | DF | KOS | Arbnor Hasani |
| 6 | DF | SUI | Rajmond Laski |
| 9 | FW | BRA | Mychell Chagas |
| 10 | MF | SUI | Manuel Kubli |
| 11 | MF | SUI | Fabio Janett |
| 14 | MF | SUI | Julio Teixeira |
| 15 | FW | SUI | Ron Sulejmani |
| 16 | FW | GER | Saliou Sané |
| 17 | MF | SUI | Arlind Dakaj |

| No. | Pos. | Nation | Player |
|---|---|---|---|
| 18 | MF | LIE | Aron Sele |
| 20 | MF | SUI | Leonardo Uka |
| 21 | DF | KOS | Mërgim Brahimi |
| 22 | MF | SRB | Samir Ramizi |
| 28 | FW | SUI | Marc Figueiredo |
| 44 | GK | COD | Joël Kiassumbua |
| 45 | FW | SUI | Junior Eyamba |
| 64 | FW | ITA | Alessandro Casciato |
| 70 | MF | SUI | Nahom Tesfom |
| 71 | DF | SUI | Bryan Mallo |
| 77 | DF | SUI | Leon Duong |
| 88 | FW | SUI | Joel Campbell |
| - | DF | SUI | Natanael Gando |

== Notable players ==
- (Switzerland) Alessandro Frigerio, 1936–1937 Nationalliga top goalscorer, participated in the 1938 FIFA World Cup
- (Brazil) Fausto dos Santos, 1933, participated in the World Cup 1930
- (Brazil) Fernando Giudicelli, 1934, participated in the World Cup 1930
- (Hungary) Sándor Kocsis, 1957–1958, member of the Hungarian Olympic Champion team (1950)
- (Croatia) Željko Matuš, 1965–1969, Olympic champion in 1960, participated in 1960 European Nations' Cup and the 1962 FIFA World Cup
