= 1940–41 FC Basel season =

FC Basel
1940–41 season
- Chairman: Albert Besse
- First team coach: Eugen Rupf
- Ground: Landhof, Basel
- 1. Liga: 1st
- Play-off: 3rd
- Swiss Cup: Round 4
- Top goalscorer: League: August Ibach (15); All: August Ibach (15)
- Highest home attendance: 3,000 on 24 November 1940 vs Aarau
- Lowest home attendance: 800 on 22 December 1940 vs Fribourg
- Average home league attendance: 2,042

The FC Basel 1940–41 season was the forty-eighth season since the club's foundation on 15 November 1893. FC Basel played their home games in the Landhof in the district Wettstein in Kleinbasel. Albert Besse was the club's chairman for the second consecutive season.

== Overview ==
Former Swiss international Eugen Rupf was appointed as manager. Basel played 27 matches in this season. 14 of these matches were in the 1. Liga, two in the play-offs, four in the Swiss Cup and seven were friendly matches. Of these friendlies three were played at home in the Landhof, four were away games. Five friendly games were won and two ended in a defeat.

Despite having been 1. Liga champions the previous season, Basel played this season in the 1. Liga as well because there had been no promotion to the top tier of Swiss football due to World War II. This season, however, two promotions were planned. 24 teams competed in the 1.Liga, which was divided into three regional groups. Basel were allocated to the Central Group, together with local rivals Concordia Basel and FC Birsfelden. Other teams in this group were Aarau, FC Bern, US Bienne-Boujean and Fribourg. Basel and Aarau dominated their group, both teams winning 11 of their 14 group games. Basel suffered one defeat, against Aarau, but won the group with 24 points, one point above Aarau, because they had been defeated twice. But in the promotion play-offs Basel were defeated by Cantonal Neuchâtel and drew the game with Zürich. Their two play-off opponents were thus promoted and Basel remained for another season in the 1 Liga.

Basel joined the Swiss Cup in the 2nd principal round and were drawn at home to and beat Old Boys 4 – 3. In round three Basel beat lower tier FC Allschwil and were drawn against higher tier Nordstern Basel in round four. After a 3 – 3 draw, Basel were knocked out when they lost the replay.

== Players ==
The following is the list of the Basel first team squad during the 1940–41 season. The list includes players that were in the squad the day the season started on 1 September 1940 but subsequently left the club after that date.

Note: Flags indicate national team as defined under FIFA eligibility rules; some limited exceptions apply. Players may hold more than one non-FIFA nationality.

No.	Pos.	Nation	Player
—	GK	SUI	Kurt Imhof
—	GK	SUI	Ernst Kipfer
—	GK	SUI	Paul Wechlin
—	DF	SUI	Henri Bernard
—	DF	SUI	Louis Favre
—	DF	SUI	Ernst Grauer
—	MF	SUI	Ernst Hufschmid
—	DF	SUI	Alexander Ebner
—	DF	SUI	Heinz Elsässer
—	MF	SUI	August Ibach

No.	Pos.	Nation	Player
—	MF	FRG	Andreas Kränzlin
—	MF	SUI	Albert Mohler
—	MF	SUI	Fritz Schmidlin (I)
—	MF	SUI	Guglielmo Spadini
—	MF	SUI	Hans Vonthron
—	MF	SUI	Werner Wenk
—	FW	SUI	Giuseppe Bossi
—	FW	SUI	Alfred Jaeck
—	FW	SUI	Alex Mathys
—	FW	SUI	Hermann Suter
—	FW	SUI	Eugen Rupf

Players who left the squad

Note: Flags indicate national team as defined under FIFA eligibility rules; some limited exceptions apply. Players may hold more than one non-FIFA nationality.

No.	Pos.	Nation	Player
—	DF	SUI	René Champod
—	DF	SUI	Hauenstein
—	DF	SUI	Fritz Huggenberger
—	MF	SUI	Walter Schmidlin (II)
—	MF	SUI	Hans Studer

No.	Pos.	Nation	Player
—	FW	SUI	Max Bosshard
—	FW		Henri Brinks
—	FW		Karl Doppler
—	FW	SUI	Kurrus
—	FW	SUI	Fritz Lanz
—	FW	SUI	Walter Zürrer

== Results ==
=== Legend ===
Win Draw Loss Postponed

=== Friendly matches ===
==== Pre and mid-season ====
1 September 1940 Pre-season	Basel	3–2	Young Fellows Zürich	Landhof, Basel
15:00	Suter (1x); Doppler (1x); Ibach (Pen. 1x)	Summary	(Pen. 1x) Kielholz (1x) Fink	Attendance: 800; Referee: (Switzerland) Muespach Basel

6 October 1935 Mid-season	Nordstern Basel	1–3	Basel	Stadion Rankhof, Basel
	Forelli (1:3)	Summary	(o.g.) (0:2) Ibach (0:3) Mathys	Attendance: 3,500; Referee: (Switzerland) Felix Herren Basel

==== Winter break ====
29 December 1940 Winter break	Basel	2–4	FC Birsfelden	Landhof, Basel
14:30	Mathys 30' (1:0); Bossi (2:3)	Summary	35' (1:1) Haller; 40' (1:2) Haller (1:3) F. Krattiger; 88' (2:4) F. Krattiger	Attendance: 1,000; Referee: (Switzerland) Müry Basel

22 February 1941 Winter break	FC Olten	0–2	Basel	Kleinholz, Olten
		Summary	(0:1) Suter (0:2) Schmidlin (I)	Attendance: 500; Referee: (Switzerland) Siegrist Olten

2 March 1941 Winter break	Basel	2–3	Blue Stars Zürich	Landhof, Basel
10:30	Jaeck (1x); Hufschmid (1x)	Summary	(1x) Aebi (1x) Schlaepfer (1x) Busenhart	Attendance: 800; Referee: (Switzerland) Hans Vogt Schweierhalle

14 April 1941 Mid-season	Brühl St. Gallen	1–2	Basel	Krontal, St. Gallen
	Joris 20' (pen. 1:1)	Summary	6' (0:1) Ibach (pen. 1:2) Ibach	Attendance: 800; Referee: (Switzerland) Ried St. Gallen

April 1941 Mid-season	FC Olten	0–2	Basel	Kleinholz, Olten
		Summary	(0:1) Schmidlin (I) (0:2) Suter

=== 1. Liga ===
==== Group Central matches ====
8 September 1940 Round 1	Fribourg	3–3	Basel	Stade Universitaire, Freiburg
	Dietrich 26' (1:0)	Summary	44' (1:1) Suter; 53' (1:2) Suter (1:3) Schmidlin (I)	Attendance: 350; Referee: (Switzerland) Marti Bern

15 September 1940 Round 2	Basel	3–1	FC Birsfelden	Landhof, Basel
	Mathys 10' (1:0); Ibach 29' (2:0); Ibach (3:0)	Summary	(3:1) Grieder	Attendance: 2,500; Referee: (Switzerland) Allemann Biel/Bienne

22 September 1940 Round 3	Solothurn	4–4	Basel	Stadion FC Solothurn, Solothurn
	Townley (1:0); Studer (2:0); Louys (3:1); Bärlocher (4:2); Bernhard (red card)	Summary	(2:1) Ibach (3:2) Mathys (4:3) Ibach (4:4) Jaeck; (red card) Elsässer	Attendance: 600; Referee: (Switzerland) von Wartburg Bern

13 October 1940 Round 4	Basel	4–1	Concordia Basel	Landhof, Basel
15:00	Ibach (1:1); Ibach (2:1); Hufschmid (3:1); Suter (4:1)	Summary	5' (0:1) Raas	Attendance: 2,000; Referee: (Switzerland) Raimondi Bern

20 October 1940 Round 5	FC Bern	2–2	Basel	Neufeld, Bern
	Weber 14' (1:0); Rupf 34' (2:1)	Summary	30' (1:1) Ibach; 68' (2:2) Suter	Attendance: 1,200; Referee: (Switzerland) Meyer LausanneD

3 November 1940 Round 6	US Bienne-Boujean	1–2	Basel	Champagne, Biel/Bienne
	Schwob 90' (1:2)	Summary	80' (0:1) Mathys; 85' (0:2) Suter	Attendance: 1,000; Referee: (Switzerland) Marti Bern

24 November 1940 Round 7	Basel	2–1	Aarau	Landhof, Basel
15:00	Ibach 4' (1:0); Ibach 28' (2:1)	Summary	7' (1:1) Stirnemann	Attendance: 3,000; Referee: (Switzerland) Scherz Bern

22 December 1940 Round 8	Basel	2–1	Fribourg	Landhof, Basel
14:30	Bossi 39' (1:0); Schmidlin (I) 41' (2:0)	Summary	59' (2:1) Paroz	Attendance: 800; Referee: (Switzerland) Raimondi Bern

9 March 1941 Round 9	Basel	5–0	FC Bern	Landhof, Basel
15:00	Suter 39' (1:0); Suter (2:0); Jaeck (3:0); Ibach (4:0); Schmidlin (I) (5:0)	Summary		Attendance: 2,000; Referee: (Switzerland) Ott Oerlikon

16 March 1941 Round 10	Aarau	4–0	Basel	Stadion Brügglifeld, Aarau
	Wüest 14' (1:0); Leutwiler 51' (2:0); Fischer 60' (3:0); Leutwiler (4:0)	Summary		Attendance: 2,000; Referee: (Switzerland) Jaggi Bern

23 March 1941 Round 11	Concordia Basel	0–2	Basel	Landhof, Basel
15:00		Summary	25' (1:0) Spadini; 71' (2:0) Spadini	Attendance: 1,500; Referee: (Switzerland) Pusterla Oerlikon

6 April 1941 Round 12	Basel	3–1	Solothurn	Landhof, Basel
15:00	Ibach 10' (1:0); Schmidlin (I) 57' (2:0); Ibach 85' (3:1)	Summary	77' (2:1) Bernet	Attendance: 2,000; Referee: (Switzerland) Raimondi Bern

27 April 1941 Round 13	Basel	9–1	US Bienne-Boujean	Landhof, Basel
13:30	Ibach (1:0); Schmidlin (I) 31' (2:0); Schmidlin (I) 34' (3:0); Schmidlin (I) 43' (4:0)Ibach (5:0)Ibach (6:0); Bossi (7:0); Ibach (8:1)Hufschmid (9:1)	Summary	70' (7:1) Egli	Attendance: 2,000; Referee: (Switzerland) von Wartburg Bern

4 May 1941 Round 14	FC Birsfelden	1–3	Basel	Sportplatz, Birsfelden
15:00	F. Krattiger 48' (1:1)	Summary	30' (1:0) Ibach; 73' (1:2) Vonthron; 84' (pen. 1:3) Suter	Attendance: 2,500; Referee: (Switzerland) Ott Oerlikon

==== Group Central table ====
Pos	Team	Pld	W	D	L	GF	GA	GD	Pts	Qualification
1	Basel	14	11	2	1	44	19	+25	24	Advance to play-off
2	Aarau	14	11	1	2	37	10	+27	23	
3	FC Bern	14	8	3	3	34	24	+10	19	
4	Solothurn	14	5	2	7	35	30	+5	12	
5	FC Birsfelden	14	4	3	7	17	27	−10	11	
6	Concordia Basel	14	3	3	8	23	40	−17	9	
7	Fribourg	14	3	1	10	20	35	−15	7	
8	US Bienne-Boujean	14	2	3	9	18	43	−25	7	

Source: rsssf.com

=== Play-offs ===
22 May 1941	Basel	1–1	Zürich	Landhof, Basel
15:00	Schmidlin (I) (1:0)	Summary	(1:1) Schneiter	Attendance: 1,200; Referee: (Switzerland) Lutz Geneva

8 June 1941	Cantonal Neuchâtel	2–1	Basel	Stade de Cantonal, Neuchâtel
15:00	Saner 6' (1:0); Saner 58' (2:0); Sandoz (red card) 62'	Summary	80' (2:1) Suter	Attendance: 3,500; Referee: (Switzerland) Schürch Winterthur

=== Swiss Cup ===
27 October 1940 2nd principal round	Basel	4–3	Old Boys	Landhof, Basel
15:00	Suter 18' (1:0); Bossi 65' (2:1); Mathys (pen.); Hufschmid (4:1)	FCB summary	28' (1:1) Mädorin (4:2) Mädorin (4:3) Oeschger	Attendance: 1,500; Referee: (Switzerland) Felix Herren Basel
Note: Old Boys played the 1940/41 season in the 2. Liga (third tier)

10 November 1940 Round 3	Basel	2–1	FC Allschwil	Landhof, Basel
15:00	Hufschmid (1:0); Bossi (2:1)	FCB summary	(1:1) Bailleux	Attendance: 1,800; Referee: (Switzerland) Hans Vogt (Schweizerhalle)
Note: Allschwil played the 1940/41 season in the 2. Liga (third tier)

12 January 1941 Round 4	Basel	3–3 (a.e.t.)	Nordstern Basel	Landhof, Basel
14:30	Suter 45' (1:1); Suter 80' (2:2); Suter (3:3)	FCB summary	21' (0:1) Martin; 73' (1:2) Derstroff (2:3) Horrisberger	Attendance: 3,000; Referee: (Switzerland) Hans Wüthrich Bern
Note: Basel played the 1940/41 season in the 1. Liga (second tier), Nordstern in the Nationalliga (top tier).

2 February 1941 Round 4 Replay	Nordstern Basel	2–0	Basel	Stadion Rankhof, Basel
14:30	Kaltenbrunner 39' (1:0); Nyffeler 88' (2:0)	FCB summary		Attendance: 4,500; Referee: (Switzerland) Jaggi Bern

== See also ==
- History of FC Basel
- List of FC Basel players
- List of FC Basel seasons

== Sources ==
- Rotblau: Jahrbuch Saison 2014/2015. Publisher: FC Basel Marketing AG. ISBN 978-3-7245-2027-6
- Die ersten 125 Jahre. Publisher: Josef Zindel im Friedrich Reinhardt Verlag, Basel. ISBN 978-3-7245-2305-5
- FCB team 1940/41 at fcb-archiv.ch
- Switzerland 1940/41 by Erik Garin at Rec.Sport.Soccer Statistics Foundation
