= 1941–42 FC Basel season =

FC Basel
1941–42 season
- Chairman: Albert Besse
- Manager: Eugen Rupf
- Ground: Landhof, Basel
- 1st League: 1st
- Play-off: Champions
- Swiss Cup: Runner-up
- Top goalscorer: League: Rodolfo Kappenberger (15); All: Hermann Suter (17)
- Highest home attendance: 4,500 on 10 May 1942 vs Blue Stars Zürich
- Lowest home attendance: 700 on 7 June 1942 vs Bellinzona
- Average home league attendance: 2,200

The 1941–42 season was Fussball Club Basel 1893's 48th season in their existence. It was their third season in the 1st League (second flight of Swiss football) after being relegated from the Nationalliga in the 1938–39 season. They played their home games in the Landhof, in the Wettstein Quarter in Kleinbasel. Albert Besse was the club's chairman for the third consecutive year. The team achieved promotion and reached the Swiss Cup final.

== Overview ==
Eugen Rupf was player-coach for his second season. Basel played 38 games in their 1941–42 season. 22 in the league group, two in the play-offs, 10 in the cup and 4 were test games. They won 27 and drew eight, they were defeated only three times. In total they scored 114 goals and conceded just 33-

There were twenty four teams contesting in the 1st League in the 1941–42 season, twelve in group East and twelve in group West. The winner of each group were to play a play-off for promotion to the Nationalliga the following year. Basel were allocated to group East together with the two other local teams Concordia Basel and FC Birsfelden. Basel started the league season well. On 31 August 1941 in the first league game against SC Juventus Zürich their striker Alex Mathys scored seven goals as Basel won by 10–1. There is no indication or evidence in the history books that this was not a goal scoring record for a single FCB player in a single match in the club's entire history. In the game on 18 January 1942 against Schaffhausen Basel won 11–0 and Erhard Grieder scored five goals. Basel finished their season as winners of group East while FC Birsfelden and Concordia were able to hold themselves clear of the relegation zone. Basel managed 18 victories and 3 draws from their 22 games, just one defeat. With a total of 39 points, scoring 77 and conceding just 15 goals Basel were five points clear of second placed Blue Stars Zürich. The promotion play-offs were then against group West winners FC Bern. The 1st leg was the away tie, this ended with a goalless draw. Basel won the 2nd leg at home at the Landhof 3–1 to achieve Promotion.

In the Swiss Cup Basel started in the 2nd principal round and were drawn at home against local rivals Old Boys. Basel won 4–2 after extra time. In round 3 they were drawn at home and won 1–0 against another local team FC Birsfelden. The fourth round was another home tie and they beat the higher tier Nationalliga team BSC Young Boys by three goals to nil. The next round gave Basel another home tie against 1st League team Solothurn and they completed an easy victory, winning 6–1. The quarter-final draw saw them playing at home again, this time against Nationlige team Lugano. The game ended 1–1 after extra time. The two clubs could not agree on a date for the replay, therefore the winners were to be decided by lottery decision. Basel qualified on toss of a coin. The semi-final gave Basel their sixth home match and their third Nationalliga club FC Grenchen. On March 29 at Stadion Rankhof the semi-final between Basel and Grenchen ended with a goalless draw after extra time. A replay, on 4 April, was required. In the Gurzelen Stadion in Biel/Bienne the replay ended with a victory. Hermann Suter scored both Basel goals as they won 2–0.

Basel thus qualified for the final which was just two days later on 6 April in the Wankdorf Stadion in Bern against the Nationalliga team Grasshopper Club. The final ended goalless after extra time and a replay was required here as well. The replay did not take place until the end of May because the Nationalliga championship had ended with a heat and thus a play-off was required here too between the Grasshoppers and Grenchen. In fact it required two games, the first ended 0–0 in Bern, the seconded ended 1–1 in Basel. The championship title was awarded to GC on goal average. The cup final replay was on 25 May, again in the Wankdorf Stadion, against the then Nationalliga champions Grasshoppers. Basel led by half time through two goals by Fritz Schmidlin, but two goals from Grubenmann a third from Neukom gave the Grasshoppers a 3–2 victory. Thus the Grasshoppers won the double.

== Players ==
Note: Flags indicate national team as defined under FIFA eligibility rules; some limited exceptions apply. Players may hold more than one non-FIFA nationality.

No.	Pos.	Nation	Player
—	GK	SUI	Silvio Cinguetti
—	GK	SUI	Kurt Imhof
—	GK	SUI	Ernst Kipfer
—	GK	SUI	Paul Wechlin
—	DF	SUI	Henri Bernard
—	DF	SUI	Louis Favre
—	DF	SUI	Ernst Grauer
—	MF	SUI	Ernst Hufschmid
—	MF	SUI	Alexander Ebner
—	MF	SUI	Heinz Elsässer
—	MF	SUI	Rodolfo Kappenberger
—	MF	SUI	Alberto Losa
—	MF	SUI	Albert Mohler

No.	Pos.	Nation	Player
—	MF	SUI	Traugott Oberer
—	MF	SUI	Fritz Schmidlin
—	MF	SUI	Guglielmo Spadini
—	MF	SUI	Hans Studer
—	MF	SUI	Hans Vonthron
—	MF	SUI	Werner Wenk
—	MF	SUI	Rudolf Wirz
—	FW	SUI	Enrico Ardizzoia
—	FW	SUI	Giuseppe Bossi
—	FW	SUI	Charles Grauwiler
—	FW	SUI	Erhard Grieder
—	FW	SUI	Rudolf Knup
—	FW	SUI	Eugen Rupf
—	FW	SUI	Hermann Suter

Players who left the squad

Note: Flags indicate national team as defined under FIFA eligibility rules; some limited exceptions apply. Players may hold more than one non-FIFA nationality.

No.	Pos.	Nation	Player
—	MF	SUI	August Ibach (to Biel-Bienne)
—	MF	FRG	Andreas Kränzlin

No.	Pos.	Nation	Player
—	FW	SUI	Alfred Jaeck
—	FW	SUI	Alex Mathys (to Brühl St. Gallen)

== Results ==
=== Legend ===
Win Draw Loss Postponed

=== Friendly matches ===
==== Pre and mid-season ====
17 August 1941 Pre-season	Luzern (Switzerland)	0–4	(Switzerland) Basel	Stadion Allmend, Luzern
		Summary	15' (0:1) Mathys; 77' (0:2) Mathys (0:3) Wenk (0:4) Ardizzoia	Attendance: 150; Referee: (Switzerland) Allgöwer (Luzern)

23 August 1941 Pre-season	Nordstern Basel (Switzerland)	3–1	(Switzerland) Basel	Stadion Rankhof, Basel
16:30	(1:1) Martin (2:1) Borer; 75' (3:1) Borer	Summary	30' (0:1) Rupf	Attendance: 1,000; Referee: (Switzerland) Muri (Basel)

5 October 1941 Mid-season	Nordstern Basel (Switzerland)	0–2	(Switzerland) Basel	Stadion Rankhof, Basel
15:45		Summary	30' (0:1) Kappenberger (0:2) Oberer	Attendance: 2,000; Referee: (Switzerland) Felix Herren (Basel)

==== Winter break ====
11 January 1942 Winter break	SC Derendingen (Switzerland)	5–6	(Switzerland) Basel	Heidenegg, Derendingen
	Herzog (I) (2x); Herzog (II) (1x); Werthmüller (1x); Stampfli (1x)	Summary	(3x) Rupf (2x) Suter (1x) Losa	Attendance: 300; Referee: (Switzerland) Dörflinger (Grenchen)

=== Nationalliga ===
==== 1st League group East, matches ====
31 August 1941 Round 1	Basel	10–1	SC Juventus Zürich	Landhof, Basel
15:00	Rupf 3' (1:0); Mathys 10' (2:0); Mathys 16' (3:0); Mathys 25' (4:0); Mathys 29' (5:0); Mathys 34' (6:1); Bossi 55' (7:1); Kappenberger (8:1); Mathys 58' (9:1); Mathys (10:1)	Summary	(5:1) Bolzan	Attendance: 1,500; Referee: (Switzerland) Iseli (Biel/Bienne)

7 September 1941 Round 2	Brühl St. Gallen	1–6	Basel	Krontal, St. Gallen
	Tanner (1:5)	Summary	17' (0:1) Mathys; 18' (0:2) Mathys; 34' (0:3) Rupf (0:4) Rupf (o.g.) (1:6) Rupf	Attendance: 1,200; Referee: (Switzerland) Hans Bollinger (Schaffhausen)

14 September 1941 Round 3	Basel	2–0	Locarno	Stadion Schützenmatte, Basel
15:00	Suter 15' (1:0); Kappenberger 75' (2:0)	Summary		Attendance: 3,000; Referee: (Switzerland) Hofer (Moutier)

28 September 1941 Round 4	Aarau	0–0	Basel	Stadion Brügglifeld, Aarau
		Summary		Attendance: 1,500; Referee: (Switzerland) Bollinger (Schaffhausen)

12 October 1941 Round 5	Basel	4–0	Chiasso	Stadion Schützenmatte, Basel
15:00	Kappenberger 8' (1:0); Schmidlin (I) 15' (2:0); Schmidlin (I) 20' (3:0); Knup 55' (4:0)	Summary		Attendance: 2,000; Referee: (Switzerland) Scanferla (Winterthur)

19 October 1941 Round 6	Blue Stars Zürich	3–0	Basel	Letzigrund, Zürich
13:30	Aeby 57' (1:0); Busenhart 66' (2:0); Aeby 83' (2:0)	Summary		Attendance: 1,500; Referee: (Switzerland) Marti (Bern)

26 October 1941 Round 7	Basel	5–1	Concordia Basel	Landhof, Basel
15:00	Kappenberger 23' (1:0); Kappenberger 38' (2:0); Kappenberger 49' (3:0); Kappenberger (4:1); Schmidlin (I) (15:1)	Summary	55' (3:1) Weber	Attendance: 1,500; Referee: (Switzerland) Ott (Baden)

2 November 1941 Round 8	SC Zug	0–1	Basel	Herti Allmend Stadion, Zug
		Summary	33' (0:1) Oberer	Attendance: 900; Referee: (Switzerland) Bihrer (Zürich)

9 November 1941 Round 9	FC Birsfelden	0–2	Basel	Sportplatz, Birsfelden
14:30		Summary	15' (0:1) Rupf (0:2) Vonthron	Attendance: 1,500; Referee: (Switzerland) Eggmann (Zürich)

30 November 1941 Round 10	Bellinzona	1–5	Basel	Campo Granata, Bellinzona
	Bottinelli 60' (1:3)	Summary	3' (0:1) Suter; 35' (0:2) Vonthron; 55' (0:3) Rupf; 67' (1:4) Hufschmid; 80' (1:5) Hufschmid	Attendance: 1,000; Referee: (Switzerland) Joseph Schürch (Winterthur)

18 January 1942 Round 11	Basel	11–0	Schaffhausen	Landhof, Basel
14:30	Losa 17' (1:0); Rupf 19' (2:0); Losa 38' (3:0); Suter 45' (4:0); Suter 47' (5:0); Grieder 49' (6:0); Grieder 52' (7:0); Suter 59' (8:0); Grieder 75' (9:0); Grieder 76' (10:0); Grieder 83' (11:0)	Summary		Attendance: 1,000; Referee: (Switzerland) Albert Stuber (Solothurn)

5 April 1942 Round 12	SC Juventus Zürich	P–P	Basel	Förrlibuck, Zürich
		[ Summary]

12 April 1942 Round 13	Basel	1–1	Brühl St. Gallen	Landhof, Basel
15:00	Losa 89' (1:1)	Summary	54' (0:1) Breitenmoser	Attendance: 2,000; Referee: (Switzerland) Ott (Baden)

19 April 1942 Round 14	Locarno	1–3	Basel	Stadio del Lido, Locarno
	Bossoni 48' (1:2)	Summary	32' (0:1) Kappenberger; 46' (0:2) Rupf; 88' (1:3) Kappenberger	Attendance: 1,500; Referee: (Switzerland) Pusterla (Oerlikon)

24 April 1942 Round 15	Basel	5–0	Aarau	Landhof, Basel
15:00	Grieder (1:0); Schmidlin (I) 53' (2:0); Grieder 61' (3:0); Schmidlin (I) 78' (4:0); Grieder 81' (5:0)	Summary		Attendance: 2,500; Referee: (Switzerland) Raimondi (Chiasso)

1 May 1942 Round 18	Concordia Basel	0–1	Basel	Landhof, Basel
15:00		Summary	22' (0:1) Suter	Attendance: 2,500; Referee: (Switzerland) Hans Wüthrich (Bern)

3 May 1942 Round 12	SC Juventus Zürich	0–3	Basel	Förrlibuck, Zürich
		Summary	(0:1) Spadini (0:2) Vonthron; 82' (0:3) Spadini	Attendance: 400; Referee: (Switzerland) Jaggi (Bern)

10 May 1942 Round 17	Basel	2–1	Blue Stars Zürich	Landhof, Basel
16:00	Rupf 69' (1:1); Rupf 85' (2:1)	Summary	22' (0:1) Maiser	Attendance: 4,500; Referee: (Switzerland) Schürch (Winterthur)

14 May 1942 Round 22	Schaffhausen	0–2	Basel	Emmersberg, Schaffhausen
		Summary	65' (0:1) Kappenberger (0:2) Kappenberger	Attendance: 1,500; Referee: (Switzerland) Scanferla (Winterthur)

17 May 1942 Round 19	Basel	2–1	SC Zug	Landhof, Basel
16:30	Suter 12' (1:0); Suter 64' (2:0)	Summary	(2:1) Mattes	Attendance: 4,000; Referee: (Switzerland) Sally Rosenbaum (Zürich/St. Gallen)

31 May 1942 Round 16	Chiasso	1–3	Basel	Stadio Comunale, Chiasso
	72' (1:2)	Summary	2' (0:1) Rupf; 8' (0:2) Suter; 85' (1:3) Schmidlin (I)	Attendance: 600; Referee: (Switzerland) Eggmann (Zürich)

6 June 1942 Round 21	Basel	7–1	Bellinzona	Landhof, Basel
15:00	Schmidlin (I) 34' (1:0); Hufschmid 46' (2:0); Kappenberger 65' (3:1); Kappenberger 70' (4:1); Kappenberger 75' (5:1); Suter (6:1); Hufschmid (7:1)	Summary	56' (2:1) Darani	Attendance: 700; Referee: (Switzerland) Josef Schürch (Winterthur)

14 June 1942 Round 20	Basel	2–2	FC Birsfelden	Landhof, Basel
17:15	Suter 70' (1:1); Suter 80' (2:2)	Summary	46' (0:1) von Arx; 74' (1:2) Haller	Attendance: 1,500; Referee: (Switzerland) Ott (Baden)

==== 1st League group East, table ====
Pos	Team	Pld	W	D	L	GF	GA	GD	Pts	Qualification or relegation
1	Basel	22	18	3	1	77	15	+62	39	Play-off for promotion
2	Blue Stars Zürich	22	15	4	3	50	25	+25	34	
3	Bellinzona	22	10	4	8	46	42	+4	24	
4	FC Birsfelden	22	10	4	8	34	33	+1	24	
5	Brühl St. Gallen	22	9	6	7	40	37	+3	24	
6	SC Zug	22	9	6	7	38	37	+1	24	
7	Locarno	22	9	1	12	52	45	+7	19	
8	Chiasso	22	8	3	11	41	45	−4	19	
9	Aarau	22	7	5	10	34	45	−11	19	
10	Concordia Basel	22	5	7	10	30	44	−14	17	
11	FC Schaffhausen	22	3	6	13	29	64	−35	12	Play-off against relegation
12	SC Juventus Zürich	22	4	1	17	34	73	−39	9	Relegated

Source: rsssf.com

=== Promotion play-off ===
21 June 1942 First leg	Bern	0–0	Basel	Stadion Neufeld
		Summary		Attendance: 7,000; Referee: (Switzerland) Josef Schürch (Winterthur)

28 June 1942 Return leg	Basel	3–1 (3–1 agg.)	Bern	Landhof, Basel
18:00	Kappenberger 17' (1:0); Suter 27' (2:0); Schmidlin (I) 62' (3:0)	Summary	80' (3:1)	Attendance: 7,000; Referee: (Switzerland) Josef Schürch (Winterthur)

Basel won 3–1 on aggregate

=== Swiss Cup ===
The winning teams from the first round were joined by the teams from this years 1. Liga to compete in the second round.

23 November 1941 2nd principal round	Basel	4–2 (a.e.t.)	Old Boys	Basel
14:30	Elsässer (red card) 46'; Rupf 86' (pen. 1:2); Kappenberger 90' (2:2); Suter 115' (3:2); Rupf (pen. 4:2)	FCB summary	20' (0:1) Oeschger; 83' (0:2) Hediger	Stadium: Landhof; Attendance: 800; Referee: (Switzerland) François Hofer (Moutier)
Note: Old Boys played the 1941/42 season in the 2. Liga (third tier).

7 December 1941 Round 3	FC Birsfelden	2–2 (a.e.t.)	Basel	Sportplatz Sternenfeld, Birsfelden
14:30	Dussy (1:0) von Arx (2:1)	FCB summary	(1:1) Vonthron (2:2) Rupf	Attendance: 500; Referee: (Switzerland) Theodor Ott (Oerlikon (Zürich))
Note: Birsfelden played the 1941/42 season in the 2. Liga (third tier).

14 December 1941 Round 3 Replay	Basel	1–0	FC Birsfelden	Basel
10:00	Suter 53' (1:0)	FCB summary		Stadium: Landhof; Attendance: 2,000; Referee: (Switzerland) Eugen Scherz (Bern)

The teams from this season's Nationalliga, who had received a bye for the first three rounds, entered the cup competition in this round. The teams from the Nationalliga were seeded in the fourth round and could not be drawn against each other. Whenever possible, the draw respected local regionalities.

31 December 1941 Round 4	Basel	3–0	BSC Young Boys	Landhof, Basel
14:30	Suter 13' (1:0); Kappenberger 39' (2:0); Rupf 50' (3:0)	FCB summary		Attendance: 4,000; Referee: (Switzerland) William Bangerter (La Chaux-de-Fonds)
Note: Young Boys played the 1941/42 season in the Nationalliga (top-tier).

15 March 1942 Round 5	Basel	6–1	Solothurn	Landhof, Basel
15:00	Suter 2' (1:0); Grieder 38' (2:1); Vonthron 42' (3:1); Grieder (4:1); Suter 61' (5:1); Grieder (6:1)	FCB summary	32' (1:1) Beetschen	Attendance: 3,000; Referee: (Switzerland) von Wartburg (Bern)
Note: Solothurn played the 1941/42 season in the 2. Liga (third tier), but they waived their home advantage due to strong competition from the other cup matches near-by, Biel-GC and Grenchen-Young Fellows. From 60th minute Solothurn down to ten players due to an injury.

22 March 1942 Quarter-final	Basel	1–1 (Note: Basel win on toss of coin) (a.e.t.)	Lugano	Basel
15:00	Grieder 90' (1:1)	FCB summary	53' (0:1) M. Fornara	Stadium: Stadion Rankhof; Attendance: 7.500; Referee: (Switzerland) Rodolphe Wittwer (Geneva)
Note: The teams could not agree upon a replay date. Lugano offered a midweek match in Lucerne or Zurich. Basel stated that its players in military-duty would not be allowed to play a weekday match. Basel qualified on toss of a coin.

29 March 1942 Semi-final	Basel	0–0 (a.e.t.)	Grenchen	Stadion Rankhof, Basel
15:00		Summary		Attendance: 10,000; Referee: (Switzerland) Josef Schürch (Winterthur)
Note: Grenchen played the 1941/42 season in the Nationalliga (top-tier). Grenchen had only ten players from the 48th minute onwards, due to an injury to Tanner.

4 April 1942 Semi-final replay	Grenchen	0–2	Basel	Gurzelen Stadion, Biel/Bienne
17:30		FCB summary	19' (1:0) Suter; 53' (2:0) Suter	Attendance: 5,500; Referee: (Switzerland) William Bangerter (La Chaux-de-Fonds)

6 April 1942 Final	Grasshopper Club	0–0 (a.e.t.)	Basel	Wankdorf Stadium, Bern
15:00		FCB summary		Attendance: 12,000; Referee: (Switzerland) Grassi Balerna

25 May 1942 Final replay	Grasshopper Club	3–2	Basel	Bern
15:00	Grubenmann 46' (1:2); Grubenmann 52' (2:2); Neukom 71'	Fussball-Schweiz summary FCB summary	15' (0:1) Schmidlin; 37' (0:2) Schmidlin	Stadium: Wankdorf Stadium; Attendance: 14,000; Referee: (Switzerland) Jean Lutz (Genève)
Note: Grasshopper Club won the cup and this was the club's ninth cup title to this date. Three weeks later the team also won the Swiss league championship and thus secured themselves the double. This was the club's third time in their history that they had achieved the double to this date.

== See also ==
- History of FC Basel
- List of FC Basel players
- List of FC Basel seasons

== Sources ==
- Rotblau: Jahrbuch Saison 2014/2015. Publisher: FC Basel Marketing AG. ISBN 978-3-7245-2027-6
- Die ersten 125 Jahre. Publisher: Josef Zindel im Friedrich Reinhardt Verlag, Basel. ISBN 978-3-7245-2305-5
- FCB team 1941–42 at fcb-archiv.ch
- Switzerland 1941–42 at RSSSF
