= 1939–40 FC Basel season =

FC Basel
1939–40 season
- Chairman: Albert Besse
- First team coach: Walter Dietrich; Max Galler
- Ground: Landhof, Basel
- 1. Liga Group 3: Winners
- 1. Liga play-off: 1. Liga champions
- Swiss Cup: Round 4
- Top goalscorer: League: August Ibach (19); All: August Ibach (20)
- Highest home attendance: 2,000 on 31 March 1940 vs Aarau
- Lowest home attendance: 500 on 18 February 1940 vs Concordia Basel and on 23 June 1940 vs Solothurn
- Average home league attendance: 1,266

The FC Basel 1939–40 season was the forty-seventh season since the club's foundation on 15 November 1893. FC Basel played their home games in the Landhof in the district Wettstein in Kleinbasel. Albert Besse was the club's new chairman. He took over from Emil Junker at the AGM on 15 July 1939. Due to the outbreak of the Second World War on 1 September 1939, the start of the Swiss football championship was postponed until 22 October. The 1. Liga was postponed until December and it was completely reorganised for this season.

== Overview ==
=== World War II ===
The outbreak of the Second World War, triggered by the German attack on Poland on 1 September 1939, was also a shock for Switzerland, although international signs had been pointing towards a war for some time. On 30 August, the Federal Assembly elected staff officer Henri Guisan as Commander-in-Chief of the Army. On 2 September, general mobilisation for war took place. The national exhibition in Zurich, during which the national football team had also played representative matches against teams from neighbouring countries, was closed for some time. The general mobilisation brought regular championship operations to a standstill, and in its place an improvised mobilisation championship was held without automatic promotion or relegation. In some cases the games could not be played or were postponed because the clubs did not have enough players available.

In Switzerland during the second world war period, sport became an integral part of the "spiritual national defense". This was a political and cultural movement that had already become increasingly important during the late 1930s. Politicians, intellectuals and media professionals had increasingly called for measures to strengthen Switzerland's basic cultural values. Since the Nationalliga games were also considered to be one of the activities that seemed important for maintaining the morale of the population, the military authorities put considerably fewer obstacles in the way of the top players and leading clubs as they had during the previous World War.

=== Format ===
Due to the outbreak of World War II on 1 September 1939 the start of the Swiss football championship was postponed until 22 October and the 1. Liga postponed until December. The 1939–40 Nationalliga was played as "Championnat Suisse de Mobilisation". The 12 teams of the top-tier competed the improvised championship as in the years before. However, the 24 clubs that competed in the 1939–40 Swiss 1. Liga were completely re-organised. This season they were divided into five regional groups (as opposed to two in previous years), this was done to reduce travelling times. There were six teams in group 1 (West), five teams in group 2 (North-West), group 3 (Central) and group 4 (North-East), but only three in group 5 (South). The teams in group 1 played a double round-robin to decide their league position. The teams in the groups 2, 3 and 4 played three round-robins and the teams in group 5 played four round-robins. Two points were awarded for a win and one point was awarded for a draw. The five group winners then contested a play-off round to decide the championship. This consisted of: a two legged semi-final for the two west group winners, a three team round-robin semi-final for the other groups and then there was to be a two legged-final for the title of 1. Liga champions. There was to be no promotion and no relegation.

After being relegated last season for the first time in the club's history, Basel played this season in the newly reorganized 1.Liga. They were allocated to group 3 (Central) together with Solothurn, Aarau and the two local clubs Concordia Basel and FC Birsfelden.

=== FCB pre-season ===
Player-manager Fernand Jaccard had left the club after the relegation season to join FC Locarno. The former players Walter Dietrich and Max Galler took over as team co-managers. Basel played a good season, in total including test matches they played 29 games, winning 22, drawing three and suffering four defeats. In total they scored 98 goals conceding 50.

After winning their four test games in October and their first Swiss Cup in November, Basel started the season well in December winning the first seven matches straight-off before suffering their first defeat at the beginning of April. At the end of the group stage Basel had won nine games drawn two and were defeated just once and with 20 points were five points above second placed Aarau. Basel advanced to the play-off stage. In the semi-final they won the round-robin against group four winners SC Brühl St. Gallen and group five winners AC Bellinzona. Basel became 1. Liga champions winning the best of three final against Fribourg. August Ibach was team top league goal scorer with 19 goals, Fritz Schmidlin, Hermann Suter and Werner Wenk each scored five times.

In the 1939–40 Swiss Cup Basel started with a victory in the 2nd principal round away against lower tier SC Zofingen. In the next round they were again drawn away from home against lower tier SC Schöftland. This was won 4–1. In the next round Basel played in the Landhof against Aarau but were defeated and knocked out of the competition.

== Players ==
The following is the list of the Basel first team squad during the season 1939–40. The list includes players that were in the squad the day the season started on 1 October 1939 but subsequently left the club after that date.

Note: Flags indicate national team as defined under FIFA eligibility rules; some limited exceptions apply. Players may hold more than one non-FIFA nationality.

No.	Pos.	Nation	Player
—	GK	SUI	Kurt Imhof
—	GK	SUI	Paul Wechlin
—	DF	SUI	Henri Bernard
—	DF	SUI	Louis Favre
—	DF	SUI	Ernst Grauer
—	MF	SUI	Ernst Hufschmid
—	DF	SUI	René Champod
—	DF	SUI	Alexander Ebner
—	DF	SUI	Heinz Elsässer
—	DF	SUI	Hauenstein
—	DF	SUI	Fritz Huggenberger
—	MF	SUI	August Ibach
—	MF	FRG	Andreas Kränzlin
—	MF	SUI	Albert Mohler

No.	Pos.	Nation	Player
—	MF	SUI	Fritz Schmidlin (I)
—	MF	SUI	Walter Schmidlin (II)
—	MF	SUI	Guglielmo Spadini
—	MF	SUI	Hans Studer
—	MF	SUI	Werner Wenk
—	FW	SUI	Max Bosshard
—	FW		Henri Brinks
—	FW		Karl Doppler
—	FW	SUI	Alfred Jaeck
—	FW	SUI	Kurrus
—	FW	SUI	Fritz Lanz
—	FW	SUI	Alex Mathys
—	FW	SUI	Hermann Suter
—	FW	SUI	Walter Zürrer

Players who left the squad

Note: Flags indicate national team as defined under FIFA eligibility rules; some limited exceptions apply. Players may hold more than one non-FIFA nationality.

No.	Pos.	Nation	Player
—	GK	SUI	Eugène de Kalbermatten
—	GK	SUI	Fritz Glaser
—	DF	SUI	Robert Büchi
—	DF	SUI	Heinrich Diethelm
—	MF	SUI	Fernand Jaccard
—	MF	FRG	Franz Sattler

No.	Pos.	Nation	Player
—	MF	SUI	Eduard Zuber
—	FW	SUI	Eduard Buser
—	FW	SUI	Maurice Dubosson
—	FW	SUI	Eduard Irniger
—	FW	SUI	Othmar Saner
—	FW	SUI	René Schaller

== Results ==
=== Legend ===
Win Draw Loss Postponed

=== Friendly matches ===
==== Pre-season ====
1 October 1939 Pre-season	Basel (Switzerland)	3–2	(Switzerland) FC Polizei Basel	Landhof, Basel
	Ibach (1:0)	Summary	(1:1) Dill

8 October 1939 Pre-season	Basel (Switzerland)	4–1	(Switzerland) Nordstern Basel	Landhof, Basel
15:00	Ibach 20' (1:1) (2:1); Grauer 77' (3:1); Ibach (pen. 4:1)	Summary	5' (0:1) Giger	Attendance: 1,200; Referee: (Switzerland) H. Neumann Basel

15 October 1939 Pre-season	FC Olten (Switzerland)	2–3	(Switzerland) Basel	Kleinholz, Olten
	Kiefer 45' (1:3); Vogel 86' (pen. 2:3)	Summary	26' (0:1) Ibach; 35' (0:2) Ibach (0:3) Ibach	Attendance: 700; Referee: (Switzerland) Grütter Olten

22 October 1939 Pre-season	Aarau (Switzerland)	2–3	(Switzerland) Basel	Stadion Brügglifeld, Aarau
	Berner (1:2); Wüest (2:3)	Summary	26' (0:1) Ibach; 36' (0:2) Bosshard (1:3) Brinks	Referee: (Switzerland) Siegrist Olten

==== Winter break and mid-season ====
28 January 1940 Winter break	Basel (Switzerland)	4–6	(Switzerland) Military Rifle Corps.	Landhof, Basel
	Goal	Summary	Goal	Attendance: 400; Referee: (Switzerland) Kettler Basel

23 March 1940 Mid-season	Basel (Switzerland)	5–2	(Switzerland) Basel Military Team	Landhof, Basel
	Ibach (3x); Mathys (1x); Schmidlin (I) (1x)	Summary	(2x) Hellstern	Attendance: 500; Referee: (Switzerland) (Switzerland) Häring Basel

24 March 1940 Mid-season	Blue Stars Zürich (Switzerland)	2–5	(Switzerland) Basel	Letzigrund, Zürich
15:00	Kuster 15' (1:0); Meister (2:0)	Summary	(1:1) Mathys (2:2) Mathys (2:3) Ibach (2:4) Ibach (2:5) Wenk	Attendance: 400; Referee: (Switzerland) Huber Zürich

6 April 1940 Mid-season	Basel (Switzerland)	7–1	(Switzerland) Fighter Pilot Corps.	Landhof, Basel
16:00	Goal	Summary	Goal	Attendance: 200; Referee: (Switzerland)

=== 1. Liga Group 3 ===
==== League matches ====
3 December 1939 Round 1	Basel	5–0	Solothurn	Landhof, Basel
14:30	Ibach (1:0); Suter (2:0); Brinks (2x); Hufschmid (pen. 1x)	Summary		Attendance: 1,800; Referee: (Switzerland) Raimondi Bern

10 December 1939 Round 2	Aarau	2–4	Basel	Stadion Brügglifeld, Aarau
	Eichenberger (1:2); Wüest	Summary	10' (pen. 0:1) Ibach (0:2) Suter (1:3) Ibach (1:4) Bosshard; (red card) 65' Ibach	Attendance: 500; Referee: (Switzerland) Iseli Biel/Bienne

17 December 1939 Round 3	Concordia Basel	1–6	Basel	Landhof, Basel
	(o.g.)	Summary	(3x) Ibach (2x) Brinks (o.g.)	Attendance: 2,000; Referee: (Switzerland) Gerber Bern

2 February 1940 Round 4	FC Birsfelden	0–1	Basel	Sportplatz, Birsfelden
14:30		Summary	35' (0:1) Mathys	Attendance: 600; Referee: (Switzerland) Müry Basel

8 February 1940 Round 5	Basel	3–2	Concordia Basel	Landhof, Basel
10:15	Ibach (1:0) (2:0) (3:0)	Summary	(3:1) Otter (3:2) Imhof	Attendance: 500; Referee: (Switzerland) Hans Vogt Schweizerhalle

10 March 1940 Round 6	Basel	4–1	FC Birsfelden	Landhof, Basel
13:40	Ibach (2x); Mathys (1x); Wenk (1x)	Summary	(1x) Dussy	Attendance: 1,000; Referee: (Switzerland) Marti Bern

31 March 1940 Round 7	Basel	1–0	Aarau	Landhof, Basel
15:00	Ibach (1:0)	Summary		Attendance: 2,000; Referee: (Switzerland) Pusterla (Oerlikon)

3 April 1940 Round 8	Solothurn	5–2	Basel	Stadion FC Solothurn, Solothurn
	Goal	Summary	(1x) Ibach (1x) Mathys	Attendance: 400; Referee: (Switzerland)

14 April 1940 Round 9	Aarau	3–3	Basel	Stadion Brügglifeld, Aarau
	(o.g. 1:0); Stirnemann (2:2); Eichenberger (3:3)	Summary	(1:1) Schmidlin (I) (1:2) Karl Doppler (2:3) Hermann Suter	Attendance: 1,500; Referee: (Switzerland) Huber Zürich

28 April 1940 Round 10	Basel	2–0	FC Birsfelden	Landhof, Basel
14:00	Schmidlin (I) (1:0); Ibach (2:0)	Summary		Attendance: 1,800; Referee: (Switzerland) Hans Vogt Schweizerhalle

16 June 1940 Round 11	Concordia Basel	1–1	Basel	Landhof, Basel
17:00	Leutwyler 60' (1:0)	Summary	75' (1:1) Karl Doppler	Attendance: 300; Referee: (Switzerland) Raimondi Bern

23 June 1940 Round 12	Basel	6–1	Solothurn	Landhof, Basel
15:00	Wenk (3x); Jaeck (1x); Schmidlin (I) (1x); Mathys (1x)	Summary	(1x) Steiner	Attendance: 500; Referee: (Switzerland) Müry Basel

==== League table ====
Pos	Team	Pld	W	D	L	GF	GA	GD	Pts	Qualification
1	Basel	12	9	2	1	38	16	+22	20	Advance to play-off
2	Aarau	12	7	1	4	37	26	+11	15	
3	Concordia Basel	12	4	1	7	26	32	−6	9	
4	Solothurn	12	4	0	8	25	35	−10	8	
5	FC Birsfelden	12	4	0	8	14	31	−17	8	

Source: RSSSF
Rules for classification: 1) Points; 2) Goal difference within the league, but decider play-off for qualifiers.

=== Championship play-offs ===
The winners of the groups 1 and 2 played the first semi-final in a two-legged tie. Fribourg won and advanced to the final. The three other group winners played a three team round-robin for the second finalist.

==== Semi-final ====
Pos	Team	Pld	W	D	L	GF	GA	GD	Pts	BRÜ	BAS	BEL
1	Brühl	2	1	1	0	5	3	+2	3	—	2–2	—
2	Basel	2	1	1	0	6	3	+3	3	—	—	4–1
3	Bellinzona	2	0	0	2	2	7	−5	0	1–3	—	—

Source: RSSSF
Rules for classification: 1) Points; 2) Head-to-head 3) Decider.

7 July 1940 Semi-final	Brühl	2–2	Basel	Krontal, St. Gallen
	Dübendorfer (1:1); Spengler 73' (2:2)	Summary	(0:1) Ibach; 40' (1:2) Lanz	Attendance: 1,500; Referee: (Switzerland) Pusterla (Oerlikon)

21 July 1940 Semi-final	Basel	4–1	Bellinzona	Landhof, Basel
15:00	Ibach (3x); Jaeck (1x)	Summary	(1x) Chiesi	Attendance: 1,500; Referee: (Switzerland) Studer Bern

Due to the equality between the two top placed teams a play-off decider was required.

28 July 1940 Replay	Basel	2–0	Brühl	Landhof, Basel
16:00	Suter (1:0); Schmidlin (I) (2:0)	Summary		Attendance: 2,500; Referee: (Switzerland) A. Sandoz Lausanne

==== Championship final ====
4 August 1940 1st Leg	Fribourg	4–0	Basel	Stade Universitaire, Freiburg
	Dietrich 50' (1:0); Dietrich (2:0); Thomet (3:0); Cotting (4:0)	Summary		Attendance: 700; Referee: (Switzerland) Meyer Lausanne

11 August 1940 2nd leg	Basel	4–2	Fribourg	Landhof, Basel
16:00	Ibach 6' (1:0); Schmidlin (I) (2:0); Wenk (3:0); Ibach (4:0)	Summary	(4:1) Dietrich (4:2) Paroz	Attendance: 2,500; Referee: (Switzerland) Jaggi Bern

Due to the egality (one win each) a play-off decider was required.

18 August 1940 Replay	Fribourg	1–2	Basel	Neufeld, Bern
	Mauroux 13' (1:0)	Summary	(1:1) Suter (1:2) Ibach	Attendance: 1,000; Referee: (Switzerland) Gerber Bern

Basel won the 1. Liga championship title, but as explained there was no promotion.

=== Swiss Cup ===
All the teams from this years 1. Liga were given a bye for the first round and they started in the competition in the second round. The teams from this season's Nationalliga, who had received byes for the first three rounds, had entered the competition in the fourth round.

26 November 1939 Round 2	SC Zofingen	1–6	Basel	Sportanlagen Trinermatten, Zofingen
	Goal	FCB summary	Goal	Attendance: 650
Note: Zofingen played the 1939/40 season in the 2. Liga (third-tier).

24 December 1939 Round 3	SC Schöftland	1–4	Basel	Sportanlage Rütimatten, Schöftland
	(pen. 1:3)	FCB summary	(0:1) (0:2) (0:3) (1:4)	Attendance: 600; Referee: (Switzerland) E. Heiniger Bern
Note: Schöftland played the 1939/40 season in the 2. Liga (third-tier).

7 January 1940 Round 4	Basel	2–4	Aarau	Landhof, Basel
14:30	Ibach (pen. 1:2) own goal (2:4)	FCB summary	(0:1) Wüest (0:2) Fischer (1:3) Beiner (1:4) Beiner	Attendance: 1,000; Referee: (Switzerland) Hofer Moutier
Note: Aarau played the 1939/40 season in the 1. Liga (second-tier).

== Further in Swiss football ==
- 1939–40 Nationalliga
- 1939–40 Swiss Cup
- 1939–40 Swiss 1. Liga

== See also ==
- History of FC Basel
- List of FC Basel players
- List of FC Basel seasons

== Sources ==
- Rotblau: Jahrbuch Saison 2014/2015. Publisher: FC Basel Marketing AG. ISBN 978-3-7245-2027-6
- Die ersten 125 Jahre. Publisher: Josef Zindel im Friedrich Reinhardt Verlag, Basel. ISBN 978-3-7245-2305-5
- FCB team 1939–40 at fcb-archiv.ch
- Switzerland 1939–40 by Erik Garin at Rec.Sport.Soccer Statistics Foundation
