= 1940–41 Swiss Cup =

Tournament details
- Country: Switzerland

Final positions
- Champions: Grasshopper Club
- Runners-up: Servette

The 1940–41 Swiss Cup was the 16th season of Switzerland's football cup competition, organised annually since the 1925–26 season by the Swiss Football Association.

== Overview ==
=== Preamble ===
In Switzerland during the second world war period, sport became an integral part of the "spiritual national defense". This was a political and cultural movement that had already become increasingly important during the late 1930s. Politicians, intellectuals and media professionals had increasingly called for measures to strengthen Switzerland's basic cultural values. Since the Nationalliga and Swiss Cup games were also considered to be part of the activities that seemed important for maintaining the morale of the population, the military authorities put considerably fewer obstacles in the way of the top players and leading clubs as they had during the previous World War. However, in 1941, the "Lex Zumbühl", named after the Swiss Football Association (ASF/SFV) president, formally banned professional football players. In addition to this, the number of foreign players allowed to play was reduced from three to one per team.

=== Format ===
This season's cup competition began with a preliminary round, which began on the week-end of 22 September 1940. The competition was to be completed on Easter Monday, 14 April 1941, with the final, which since 1937, was traditionally held in the country's capital, at the former Wankdorf Stadium in Bern. The preliminary round was held for the lower league teams that had not qualified themselves for the competition. The lower league teams that had qualified via their regional football association's own cup competitions, or had achieved their association's requirements, joined the competition in the first round. The clubs from this season's 1. Liga were given a bye for the first round and started in the second round. The clubs from the 1940–41 Nationalliga were given byes for the first three rounds. These teams joined the competition in the fourth round which, with one exception, was played on the first week-end in the New Year.

The matches were played in a knockout format. In the event of a draw after 90 minutes, the match went into extra time. In the event of a draw at the end of extra time, if agreed between the clubs, a replay was foreseen and this was played on the visiting team's pitch. Rules and regulations to this situation were altered and amended continuously by each regional football association, due to the current situation (second world war). If the replay ended in a draw after extra time, or if a replay had not been agreed, a toss of a coin would establish the team that qualified for the next round.

== Preliminary round ==
The lower league teams that had not qualified themselves for the competition via their regional football association's own regional cup competitions or had not achieved their association's requirements, competed here in a second chance round. Reserve teams were not admitted to the competition. The draw respected local regionalities. The preliminary round was played on 22 September 1940.

=== Summary ===
Team 1	Score	Team 2
22 September 1940
CA Genève (t)	1–1 (a.e.t.)	FC Gardy-Jonction (GE)
Racing Club Lausanne	4–2	ES Malley
FC Renens	4–1	CS La Tour-de-Peilz
FC Yverdon	3–4	Richemond-Daillettes (FR)
SC Derendingen	2–1	FC Luterbach
US Bottecchia (BS)	2–3	SV Sissach
SV Helvetik Basel	4–3	FC Pratteln
VfR Kleinhüningen	5–1	FC Riehen
Delémont	4–1	Laufen
FC Nidau	1–2	FC Aurore Bienne
Moutier	8–3	FC Tramelan
FC Schönenwerd	1–3	FC Langenthal
Burgdorf	4–3	Thun
FC Altstetten (Zürich)	7–2	Polizei Zürich
FC Industrie Zürich	0–3	FC Adliswil
FC Gränichen	5–2	FC Lenzburg
Schöftland	7–2	FC Turgi
FC Unterentfelden	4–4 (a.e.t.)	FC Muhen
FC Küsnacht	2–3	Red Star
FC Horgen	6–4	FC Wädenswil
Kreuzlingen	5–0	FC Bischofszell
SC Veltheim	1–5	FC Wülflingen
FC Flawil	2–3	Herisau
Paradies Feuerthalen	3–1	FC Neuhausen

- Note to the match CA Genève–Jonction: no replay was agreed between the two teams. CA Genève qualified on toss of a coin.

Replay

Team 1	Score	Team 2
23 September 1940
FC Muhen	4–6	FC Unterentfelden

== Round 1 ==
In the first round, the lower league teams that had already qualified themselves for the competition through their regional football association's own regional requirements competed here, together with the winners of the preliminary round. All the teams from this years 1. Liga were given a bye and they started in the next round. Whenever possible, the draw respected local regionalities. The first round was played on 29 September.

=== Summary ===
Team 1	Score	Team 2
29 September 1940
FC Horgen	2–6	Kickers Luzern
Wohlen	10–0	FC Buchs (AG)
SC Olympia Basel	1–3	Old Boys
Black Stars	0–6	VfR Kleinhüningen
Winterthur	2–1	FC Tössfeld (Winterthur)
Burgdorf	5–1	Zähringia Bern
FC Aesch	6–4	Sportfreunde Basel
FC Aurore Bienne	0–1	FC Madretsch (Biel)
FC Buchs (SG)	7–0	FC Widnau
FC Wallisellen	5–3	Zürcher BC
FC Adliswil	2–3	Red Star
SC Derendingen	3–4	FC Gerlafingen
Vgt Trimbach-Olten	2–1	FC Olten
FC Schaffhausen	3–0	Paradies Feuerthalen
FC St.Margarethen	1–3	Arbon
FC Fortuna St.Gallen	2–1	Herisau
Frauenfeld	1–1 (a.e.t.)	Kreuzlingen
FC Höngg	1–7	SV Seebach
FC Oerlikon (ZH)	4–0	SC Wipkingen
FC Wiedikon	1–5	Uster
FC Diana (Zürich)	3–6	FC Altstetten (Zürich)
FC Romanshorn	4–4 (a.e.t.)	FC Rorschach (t)
FC Töss (Winterthur)	1–3	FC Wülflingen
Schöftland	10–1	FC Unterentfelden
Sporting Aarau	4–4 (a.e.t.)	FC Gränichen (t)
FC Langenthal	3–2	Zofingen
FC Lachen	3–1	FC Thalwil
Chur	0–4	FC Ems
FC La Neuveville	6–4	Comète Peseux
FC Aegerten-Brügg	1–0	FC Grünstern (Ipsach)
FC Liestal	1–3	Delémont
SV Sissach	4–1	FC Breite (Basel)
FC Viktoria Bern	2–1	FC Helvetia Bern
Minerva Bern	3–4	Köniz
Baden	4–3	FC Rupperswil
FC Erlinsbach	2–4	Wettingen
Wacker Grenchen	3–2	FC Reconvillier
FC Allschwil	4–3	Muttenz
FC Thangen	1–3	SV Schaffhausen
FC Oberwinterthur	3–2	FC Phönix (Winterthur)
Moutier	7–0	FC Kestenholz
FC Porrentruy	2–1	SV Helvetik Basel
Amicale Abattoirs (GE)	3–0	Compesières FC (GE)
FC Aigle	0–4 (a.e.t.)	Racing Club Lausanne
Sion	5–0	Martigny-Sports
FC Chippis	2–3	FC Sierre
Colombier	4–1	Couvet-Sports
FC Fleurier	1–7	FC Xamax (Neuchâtel)
FC Gland	2–3	Stade Lausanne
Olimpia Vevey	1–13	FC Renens
CA Genève	4–3 (a.e.t.)	Espérance Genève
FC Concordia Yverdon	2–0	FC Stade Payerne
CS International Genève	1–1 (a.e.t.); Replayed	Chênois
FC Gloria Le Locle-Sports	3–3 (a.e.t.); Replayed	Sylva-Sports Le Locle
Richemond-Daillettes (FR)	ppd Replayed	Central Fribourg

US Pro Daro bye

- Note (t): Match Romanshorn—Rorschach no replay was agreed between the two teams. Rorschach qualified on toss of a coin.
- Note (t): Match Sporting Aarau—Gränichen no replay was agreed between the two teams. Gränichen qualified on toss of a coin.

Replays

Team 1	Score	Team 2
13 October 1940
Chênois	1–2	CS International Genève
Sylva-Sports Le Locle	3–1	FC Gloria Le Locle-Sports
Central Fribourg	8–0	Richemond-Daillettes (FR)

=== Matches ===
29 September 1940

Sporting Aarau	4–4 (a.e.t.)	FC Gränichen
Goal	FCA summary	Goal

Stadion Brügglifeld, Aarau
- Both teams played the 1940/41 season in the 2. Liga (third tier).
- Note: No replay was agreed between the two teams. FC Gränichen qualified on toss of a coin.

== Round 2 ==
The winning teams from the first round were joined by the 24 teams from this years 1. Liga to compete in the second round.

=== Summary ===
Team 1	Score	Team 2
27 October 1940
US Pro Daro	4–1	Chiasso
Kickers Luzern	0–7	Bellinzona
Wohlen	1–4	Locarno
Basel	4–3	Old Boys
VfR Kleinhüningen	0–5	FC Birsfelden
Winterthur	4–4 (a.e.t.)	Brühl
Burgdorf	0–4	Vevey Sports
Concordia Basel	4–2	FC Aesch
FC Madretsch (Biel)	3–1	FC Forward Morges
Zürich	7–2	FC Buchs (SG)
Aarau	2–1	FC Wallisellen
SC Zug	8–2	Red Star
FC Gerlafingen	1–2	US Bienne-Boujean
Solothurn	5–0	Vgt Trimbach-Olten
FC Schaffhausen	2–0	Arbon
FC Fortuna St.Gallen	0–7	Kreuzlingen
SV Seebach	0–1	FC Oerlikon (ZH)
Uster	2–7	FC Altstetten (Zürich)
FC Rorschach	1–2 (a.e.t.)	Juventus Zürich
FC Wülflingen	1–6	Blue Stars
Schöftland	2–0	Bern
FC Gränichen	3–2	FC Langenthal
FC Lachen	2–1	FC Ems
FC La Neuveville	3–1	FC Aegerten-Brügg
Delémont	6–0	SV Sissach
FC Viktoria Bern	2–3 (a.e.t.)	Köniz
Baden	0–0 (a.e.t.)	Wettingen
Wacker Grenchen	2–3 (a.e.t.)	FC Allschwil
SV Schaffhausen	5–2	FC Oberwinterthur
Moutier	1–0	FC Porrentruy
Amicale Abattoirs (GE)	2–6	USI Dopolavoro Genève
Urania Genève Sport	7–1	Racing Club Lausanne
Sion	0–1	Montreux-Sports
Central Fribourg	0–5	Fribourg
Monthey	2–2 (a.e.t.)	FC Sierre
Colombier	2–5	FC Xamax (Neuchâtel)
Stade Lausanne	2–1	FC Renens
CA Genève	4–1	CS International Genève
Sylva-Sports Le Locle	4–9	Étoile-Sporting
FC Concordia Yverdon	1–2 (a.e.t.)	Cantonal Neuchâtel

Replays

Team 1	Score	Team 2
3 November 1940
Wettingen	1–2	Baden
10 November 1940
Brühl	2–0	Winterthur
FC Sierre	4–5	Monthey

=== Matches ===
27 October 1940
15:00

Basel	4–3	Old Boys
Suter 18' (1:0); Bossi 65' (2:1); Mathys (pen.); Hufschmid (4:1)	FCB summary	28' (1:1) Mädorin (4:2) Mädorin (4:3) Oeschger

Landhof, Basel
Attendance: 1,500
Referee: (Switzerland) Felix Herren Basel
- Old Boys played the 1940/41 season in the 2. Liga (third tier), Basel in the 1. Liga (second tier).

27 October 1940
13:00

Zürich	7–2	FC Buchs (SG)
Bosshard (1:0); Bosshard (2:0); Bösch (3:0); Seiler (4:0); Bosshard (5:0); Bosshard (6:1); Bosshard (7:2)	FCZ summary	(5:1) Gross (6:2) Gross

Hardturm, Zürich
Attendance: 1,500
Referee: (Switzerland) Karl Massa (Uster)
- FC Buchs (SG) played the 1940/41 season in the 3. Liga (fourth tier), Zürich in the 1. Liga (second tier).

27 October 1940

Aarau	2–1	FC Wallisellen
Goal	FCA summary	Goal

Stadion Brügglifeld, Aarau
- Wallisellen played the 1940/41 season in the 3. Liga (fourth tier), Aarau in the 1. Liga (second tier).

== Round 3 ==
=== Summary ===
Team 1	Score	Team 2
10 November 1940
Vevey Sports	6–1	FC Madretsch (Biel)
Fribourg	1–2	Köniz
Cantonal Neuchâtel	5–0	FC La Neuveville
Urania Genève Sport	2–0	CA Genève
FC Xamax (Neuchâtel)	3–4 (a.e.t.)	Étoile-Sporting
Aarau	6–1	FC Altstetten (Zürich)
Concordia	1–0 (a.e.t.)	Delémont
Moutier	4–0	FC Birsfelden
FC Lachen	3–1	SC Zug
Locarno	3–2	Baden
Schöftland	2–4 (a.e.t.)	Solothurn
Basel	2–1	FC Allschwil
US Bienne-Boujean	4–0	FC Gränichen
Blue Stars	6–2	Kreuzlingen
FC Schaffhausen	1–0	Juventus Zürich
Zürich	4–3 (a.e.t.)	FC Oerlikon (ZH)
Bellinzona	1–2	US Pro Daro
USI Dopolavoro Genève	5–1	Stade Lausanne
Brühl	4–2	SV Schaffhausen
15 December 1940
Montreux-Sports	1–2 (a.e.t.)	Monthey

=== Matches ===
10 November 1940

Aarau	6–1	FC Altstetten (Zürich)
Goal	FCA summary	Goal

Stadion Brügglifeld, Aarau
- Altstetten played the 1940/41 season in the 2. Liga (third tier)

10 November 1940
15:00

Basel	2–1	FC Allschwil
Hufschmid (1:0); Bossi (2:1)	FCB summary	(1:1) Bailleux

Landhof, Basel
Attendance: 1,800
Referee: (Switzerland) Hans Vogt (Schweizerhalle)
- Allschwil played the 1940/41 season in the 2. Liga (third tier)

10 November 1940
14:30

Zürich	4–3 (a.e.t.)	FC Oerlikon (ZH)
Schneiter 50' (1:2); Bösch 60' (2:2); Seiler 70' (3:2); Bosshard 115' (4:3)	FCZ summary	26' (0:1) Bohren; 34' (0:2) Taddei; 90' (3:3) Moser

Letzigrund, Zürich
Attendance: 1,000
Referee: (Switzerland) Walter Häring (Basel)
- Oerlikon played the 1940/41 season in the 2. Liga (third tier)

== Round 4 ==
The teams from this season's Nationalliga, who had received byes for the first three rounds, entered the cup competition in this round. The teams from the Nationalliga were seeded and could not be drawn against each other. Whenever possible, the draw respected local regionalities. With one exception, the games of the fourth round were to be played the first week-end after the New Year, but the bad weather was the cause of many postponements.

=== Summary ===
Team 1	Score	Team 2
29 December 1940
USI Dopolavoro Genève	0–10	Servette
5 January 1941
Grenchen	0–0 * Abd at 22'	US Bienne-Boujean
FC Lachen	2–6	Grasshopper Club
US Pro Daro	1–2	Lugano
Luzern	0–1	Aarau
Young Fellows	2–2 (a.e.t.)	Blue Stars
Locarno	0–0 (a.e.t.)	Solothurn

- All other games were postponed, due to bad weather and were rescheduled.
- Note: Match Grenchen–Bienne-Boujean abandoned after 22 minutes due to frozen pitch, match was replayed.

Rescheduled games

Team 1	Score	Team 2
12 January 1941
Köniz	0–2	Biel-Bienne
Young Boys	6–0	Cantonal Neuchâtel
Concordia	1–0	Moutier
Basel	3–3 (a.e.t.)	Nordstern
Monthey	2–6	Vevey Sports
26 January 1941
Brühl	0–2	St. Gallen
Urania Genève Sport	1–2	Lausanne-Sport
Étoile-Sporting	1–3 *	La Chaux-de-Fonds
FC Schaffhausen	1–2	Zürich

- Note: The match Etoile Sporting LCF–1-3 FC La Chaux-de-Fonds was played in Neuchâtel

Replays

Team 1	Score	Team 2
12 January 1941
Grenchen	4–0	US Bienne-Boujean
19 January 1941
Nordstern	0–0 * Abd at 30'	Basel
2 February 1941
Blue Stars	0–2	Young Fellows
Solothurn	4–5	Locarno

- Note: Match Nordstern–Basel abandoned after 30 minutes due to bad weather, match was replayed.

Second replay

Team 1	Score	Team 2
2 February 1941
Nordstern	2–0	Basel

=== Matches ===
29 December 1940

USI Dopolavoro Genève	0–10	Servette
	Servette summary	4x Monnard; 2x Aeby; 2x A. Abegglen; 1x Walaschek; 1x Pasteur

Stade des Charmilles, Geneva
- USI Dopolavoro played the 1940/41 season in the 1. Liga (second tier), Servette in the Nationalliga (top tier).

5 January 1941

Luzern	0–1	Aarau
	FCA summary	84' (0:1) Wüst

Stadion Allmend, Lucerne
- Luzern played the 1940/41 season in the Nationalliga (top tier), Aarau in the 1. Liga (second tier).

12 January 1941

Grenchen	4–0	US Bienne-Boujean
Ducommun 25' (1:0); P. Aeby 65' (2:0); Righetti (3:0); Schafroth (4:0)	RSSSF summary

Stadium Brühl, Grenchen
- Grenchen played the 1940/41 season in the Nationalliga (top tier), Bienne-Boujean in the 1. Liga (second tier).

12 January 1941

Young Boys	6–0	Cantonal Neuchâtel
Knecht 11' (1:0); Blaser 32' (2:0); Blaser 33' (3:0); Terretaz 55' (4:0); Blaser 79' (5:0); Blaser 80' (6:0)	RSSSF summary

Wankdorf Stadium, Bern
- Young Boys played the 1940/41 season in the Nationalliga (top tier), Cantonal Neuchâtel in the 1. Liga (second tier).

12 January 1941
14:30

Basel	3–3 (a.e.t.)	Nordstern Basel
Suter 45' (1:1); Suter 80' (2:2); Suter (3:3)	FCB summary	21' (0:1) Martin; 73' (1:2) Derstroff (2:3) Horrisberger

Landhof, Basel
Attendance: 3,000
Referee: (Switzerland) Hans Wüthrich Bern
- Basel played the 1940/41 season in the 1. Liga (second tier), Nordstern in the Nationalliga (top tier).

2 February 1941
14:30
Replay

Nordstern Basel	2–0	Basel
Kaltenbrunner 39' (1:0); Nyffeler 88' (2:0)	FCB summary

Stadion Rankhof, Basel
Attendance: 4,500
Referee: (Switzerland) Jaggi Bern

2 February 1941

FC Schaffhausen	1–2	Zürich
Friedländer 60' (1:2)	FCZ summary	44' (0:1) Bosshard; 45' (0:2) Bösch

Sportplatz Bühl, Schaffhausen
Attendance: 1,200
Referee: (Switzerland) Walter Pfister (Buchs, Aargau)
- FC Schaffhausen played the 1940/41 season in the 2. Liga (third tier), Zürich in the 1. Liga (second tier)

== Round 5 ==
=== Summary ===
Team 1	Score	Team 2
26 January 1941
Vevey Sports	0–5	Servette
Biel-Bienne	1–2	Young Boys
2 February 1941
Lausanne-Sport	2–1	La Chaux-de-Fonds
St. Gallen	2–4	Lugano
Concordia	2–1 (a.e.t.) *	Aarau
9 February 1941
Grasshopper Club	4–4 (a.e.t.)	Locarno
Nordstern	2–4	Grenchen
Young Fellows	4–1	Zürich

Replay

Team 1	Score	Team 2
16 February 1941
Locarno	1–3	Grasshopper Club

- Note: The match Concordia–Aarau was played in Aarau.

=== Matches ===
26 January 1941

Vevey Sports	0–5	Servette
	Servette summary	20' (0:1) Monnard; 40' (0:2) Aeby; 65' (0:3) Monnard; 66' (0:4) A. Abegglen; 82' (0:5) Aeby

Stade de Copet, Vevey
- Vevey played the 1940/41 season in the 1. Liga (second tier).

26 January 1941

Biel-Bienne	1–2	Young Boys
Frangi 53' (1:1)	RSSSF summary	35' (0:1) Knecht; 58' (1:2) Eggimann

Stadion Gurzelen, Biel/Bienne
- Biel-Bienne played the 1940/41 season in the Nationalliga (top tier).

2 February 1941

Concordia	2–1 (a.e.t.)	Aarau
Schmitt; Huggenberger	FCA summary	(pen.) Schaer

Stadion Brügglifeld, Aarau
- Concordia played the 1940/41 season in the 1. Liga (second tier).

9 February 1941

Young Fellows	4–1	Zürich
Nausch 50' (1:1); Fink 65' (2:1); Fink 70' (3:1); Dériaz 80' (1:4)	FCZ summary	48' (0:1) Bösch

Hardturm, Zürich
Attendance: 3,000
Referee: (Switzerland) Hans Wüthrich, (Bern)
- Young Fellows played the 1940/41 season in the Nationalliga (top tier).

== Quarter-finals ==
=== Summary ===
Team 1	Score	Team 2
9 February 1941
Servette	6–2	Lugano
Young Boys	ppd *	Lausanne-Sport
16 February 1941
Grenchen	2–0	Young Fellows
23 February 1941
Concordia	2–5	Grasshopper Club

- Note: The match Young Boys–Lausanne-Sport was postponed due to bad weather and rescheduled.

Rescheduled

Team 1	Score	Team 2
16 February 1941
Young Boys	2–1	Lausanne-Sport

=== Matches ===
9 February 1941

Servette	6–2	Lugano
Fuchs; Walaschek; 2x Aeby; Buchoux; Monnard	Servette summary	Frigerio; Weber

Stade des Charmilles, Geneva

== Semi-finals ==
=== Summary ===
Team 1	Score	Team 2
2 March 1941
Grasshopper Club	3–0 (a.e.t.)	Grenchen
Servette	4–2	Young Boys

=== Matches ===
2 March 1941

Grasshopper Club	3–0 (a.e.t.)	Grenchen
Grubenmann 96' (1:0); Bianchi 114' (2:0); Bickel 118' (3:0)	RSSSF summary

Wankdorf Stadium, Bern
Attendance: 5,500
Referee: (Switzerland) Rudolphe Wittwer (Geneva)

2 March 1941

Servette	4–2	Young Boys
Buchoux 19' (1:1); Fuchs 61' (2:1); Walaschek 75' (pen.); A. Abegglen 80' (4:2)	RSSSF summary	5' (0:1) Knecht; 78' (3:2) Trachsel

Pontaise, Lausanne
Attendance: 6,000
Referee: (Switzerland) Felix Herren (Basel)

== Final ==
The final was traditionally held in the capital Bern, at the former Wankdorf Stadium. It took place on Easter Monday, 14 April. Because a replay was required, this took place on Ascension Thursday, 22 May 1941.

=== Summary ===
Team 1	Score	Team 2
14 April 1941
Grasshopper Club	1–1	Servette

Replay

Team 1	Score	Team 2
22 May 1941
Grasshopper Club	2–0	Servette

=== Telegram ===
14 April 1941
15:00

Grasshopper Club	1–1 (a.e.t.)	Servette
Bianchi 10' (1:0)	Fussball-Schweiz summary	79' (1:1) Guinchard

Wankdorf Stadium, Bern
Attendance: 12,000
Referee: (Switzerland) William Bangerter (La Chaux-de-Fonds)

22 May 1941
15:00
Replay

Grasshopper Club	2–0	Servette
Sulger 7' (1:0); Sulger 35' (2:0)	Fussball-Schweiz summary

Wankdorf Stadium, Bern
Attendance: 10,000
Referee: (Switzerland) Eugen Scherz (Interlaken)

Grasshopper Club won the cup and this was the club's eighth cup title to this date.

== Further in Swiss football ==
- 1940–41 Nationalliga
- 1940–41 Swiss 1. Liga
- 1940–41 FC Basel season

== Sources ==
- Fussball-Schweiz
- FCB Cup games 1940–41 at fcb-achiv.ch
- Switzerland 1940–41 at RSSSF

Preceded by 1939–40	Swiss Cup seasons	Succeeded by 1941–42
