= 1940–41 BSC Young Boys season =

BSC Young Boys
1940–41 season
- Chairman: Eduard Studer
- Manager: Hans Pulver
- Stadium: Stadion Wankdorf
- Nationalliga: 2nd
- Swiss Cup: Semi-finals

The 1940–41 season was the 42nd season in the history of Berner Sport Club Young Boys. The team played their home games at Stadion Wankdorf in Bern.

== Overview ==
Young Boys achieved a second-place finish and reached the semi-finals of the Swiss Cup where they lost to Geneva-based Servette FC.

== Players ==
- Maurice Glur
- Achille Siegrist
- Louis Gobet
- Otto Hänni
- Ernst Siegenthaler
- Cuany
- Hans Stegmeier
- Fritz Knecht
- Hans Trachsel
- Willy Terretaz
- Olivier Eggimann

== Competitions ==
=== Overall record ===
Competition	First match	Last match	Starting round	Final position	Record							
Competition	First match	Last match	Starting round	Final position	Pld	W	D	L	GF	GA	GD	Win %
Nationalliga	8 September 1940	8 June 1941	Matchday 1	2nd	22	15	5	2	50	9	+41	68.18
Swiss Cup	12 January 1941	2 March 1941	Round 4	Semi-finals	4	3	0	1	12	6	+6	75.00
Total					26	18	5	3	62	15	+47	69.23

Source: Competitions

=== Nationalliga ===
==== League table ====
Pos	Team	Pld	W	D	L	GF	GA	GD	Pts	Qualification or relegation
1	Lugano	22	17	3	2	57	16	+41	37	Swiss champions
2	Young Boys	22	15	5	2	50	9	+41	35	
3	Servette	22	15	3	4	55	27	+28	33	
4	Grasshopper Club	22	13	3	6	46	31	+15	29	Swiss Cup winners
5	Lausanne-Sport	22	11	2	9	34	17	+17	24	

Source: rsssf.com
Rules for classification: 1) Points; 2) Goal difference within the league, however with play-off for qualifiers;

==== Matches ====
8 September 1940 1	Young Boys	4–1	St. Gallen	Bern
				Stadium: Stadion Wankdorf; Attendance: 1,000; Referee: Adrien Sandoz

22 September 1940 2	Young Boys	2–3	Servette	Bern
				Stadium: Stadion Wankdorf; Attendance: 5,000; Referee: Felix Herren

29 September 1940 3	Grasshopper Club Zürich	0–4	Young Boys	Zürich
				Stadium: Hardturm; Attendance: 3,000; Referee: Mario Grassi

13 October 1940 4	Young Boys	5–0	FC Biel-Bienne	Bern
				Stadium: Stadion Wankdorf; Attendance: 2,500; Referee: Jean Lutz

20 October 1940 5	Luzern	0–6	Young Boys	Lucerne
				Stadium: Stadion Allmend; Attendance: 3,200; Referee: Hans Vogt

3 November 1940 6	Young Boys	4–1	FC Nordstern Basel	Bern
				Stadium: Stadion Wankdorf; Attendance: 3,500; Referee: Jean Lutz

24 November 1940 8	Young Boys	2–0	FC Lausanne-Sport	Bern
				Stadium: Stadion Wankdorf; Attendance: 6,000; Referee: Karl Wunderlin

1 December 1940 9	Young Fellows Zürich	0–3	Young Boys	Zürich
				Stadium: Letzigrund; Attendance: 3,200; Referee: Felix Herren

15 December 1940 11	Lugano	1–0	Young Boys	Lugano
				Stadium: Campo Marzio; Attendance: 3,500; Referee: William Bangerter

22 December 1940 10	Young Boys	1–1	FC Grenchen	Bern
				Stadium: Stadion Wankdorf; Attendance: 2,500; Referee: Karl Wunderlin

23 February 1941 12	St. Gallen	1–5	Young Boys	St. Gallen
				Stadium: Espenmoos; Attendance: 800; Referee: Hans Vogt

16 March 1941 13	Servette	0–2	Young Boys	Geneva
				Stadium: Stade des Charmilles; Attendance: 6,500; Referee: Felix Herren

23 March 1941 14	Young Boys	1–0	Grasshopper Club Zürich	Bern
				Stadium: Stadion Wankdorf; Attendance: 7,000; Referee: Karl Wunderlin

30 March 1941 15	FC Biel-Bienne	0–0	Young Boys	Biel/Bienne
				Stadium: Stadion Gurzelen; Attendance: 2,500; Referee: Rodolphe Wittwer

6 April 1941 16	Young Boys	0–0	Luzern	Bern
				Stadium: Stadion Wankdorf; Attendance: 2,500; Referee: Hans Vogt

27 April 1941 17	FC Nordstern Basel	0–3	Young Boys	Basel
				Stadium: Stadion Rankhof; Attendance: 3,800; Referee: Rodolphe Wittwer

4 May 1941 18	FC La Chaux-de-Fonds	1–3	Young Boys	La Chaux-de-Fonds
				Stadium: Centre Sportif de la Charrière; Attendance: 3,000; Referee: Studer

11 May 1941 19	FC Lausanne-Sport	0–1	Young Boys	Lausanne
				Stadium: Stade olympique de la Pontaise; Attendance: 3,000; Referee: Rodolphe Wittwer

18 May 1941 20	Young Boys	2–0	Young Fellows Zürich	Bern
				Stadium: Stadion Wankdorf; Attendance: 2,000; Referee: Jean Lutz

25 May 1941 21	Grenchen	0–0	Young Boys	Grenchen
				Stadium: Stadion Brühl; Attendance: 2,200; Referee: Studer

5 June 1941 7	Young Boys	2–0	FC La Chaux-de-Fonds	Bern
	Olivier Eggimann 3'; Fritz Knecht 70'			Stadium: Stadion Wankdorf; Attendance: 1,000; Referee: Eugen Scherz

8 June 1941 22	Young Boys	0–0	Lugano	Bern
				Stadium: Stadion Wankdorf; Attendance: 4,000; Referee: Rodolphe Wittwer

=== Swiss Cup ===
12 January 1941 Round 4	Young Boys	6–0	Cantonal Neuchâtel	Bern
				Stadium: Stadion Wankdorf

26 January 1941 Round of 16	FC Biel-Bienne	1–2	Young Boys	Biel/Bienne
				Stadium: Stadion Gurzelen

9 February 1941 Quarter-finals	Young Boys	Postponed	Lausanne-Sports	Bern
				Stadium: Stadion Wankdorf

16 February 1941 Quarter-finals	Young Boys	2–1	Lausanne-Sports	Bern
				Stadium: Stadion Wankdorf

2 March 1941 Semi-finals	Servette	4–2	Young Boys	Lausanne
				Stadium: Stade olympique de la Pontaise
