= Silvio Cinguetti =

Swiss footballer (born 1911)

Personal information
- Full name: Silvio Cinguetti
- Date of birth: 1911
- Place of birth: Switzerland
- Position: Goalkeeper

Senior career*
Years	Team	Apps	(Gls)
1931–1940	FC St. Gallen		
1940–1941	SC Brühl St. Gallen		
1941–1943	FC Basel	34	(0)
- * Club domestic league appearances and goals

Silvio Cinguetti (Italian pronunciation: [ˈsilvjo tʃiŋˈɡwetti]; 1911 – ?) was a Swiss footballer who played in the 1930s and early 1940s. He played as goalkeeper.

Cinguetti started his football by FC St. Gallen as they played in the Nationalliga. He played for them between 1931 and 1940. During this time St. Gallen were relegated twice and won promotion twice. After his time with the FC St. Gallen, Cinguetti moved to SC Brühl St. Gallen for one season.

Cinguetti joined Basel's first team in their 1941–42 season. During his time with Basel he shared the goalkeeping with Kurt Imhof and Paul Wechlin. After one test match, Cinguetti played his domestic league debut for the club, and achieved his first shut-out, in the away game on 28 September as Basel played a goalless draw against Aarau. Basel finished this season as winners of group East and qualified for the play-offs. The promotion play-offs were then against group West winners FC Bern. The first leg was the away tie, this ended with a goalless draw. Basel won the second leg at home at the Landhof 3–1. Cinguetti played in 18 of the 22 group stage matches plus the two play-off matches and achieved promotion with his team.

In the Swiss Cup that season Basel advanced to the final, which ended goalless after extra time and a replay was required. This was held on 25 May 1942, in the Wankdorf Stadion, against the new Nationalliga champions Grasshopper Club. Basel led by half time through two goals by Fritz Schmidlin, but two goals from Grubenmann a third from Neukom gave the Grasshoppers a 3–2 victory. Cinguetti played in all ten cup matches including the final and the replay.

The following season Cinguetti played in 14 of 26 domestic league games, but not in the cup matches. At the end of the season he ended his active football career.

In his two seasons with the club Cinguetti played a total of 48 games for Basel. 34 of these games were in the Swiss Serie A, ten in the Swiss Cup and four were friendly games.

== Sources ==
- Rotblau: Jahrbuch Saison 2017/2018. Publisher: FC Basel Marketing AG. ISBN 978-3-7245-2189-1
- Die ersten 125 Jahre. Publisher: Josef Zindel im Friedrich Reinhardt Verlag, Basel. ISBN 978-3-7245-2305-5
- Verein "Basler Fussballarchiv" Homepage

(NB: Despite all efforts, the editors of these books and the authors in "Basler Fussballarchiv" have failed to be able to identify all the players, their date and place of birth or date and place of death, who played in the games during the early years of FC Basel)
