= Joseph Bossi =

Swiss footballer (born 1911)

Personal information
- Full name: Giuseppe Bossi
- Date of birth: 29 August 1911
- Place of birth: Switzerland
- Height: 5 ft 7 in (1.70 m)
- Position: Forward

Senior career*
| Years | Team | Apps | (Gls) |
| 1933–1934 | FC Lausanne-Sport | | |
| 1934–1936 | FC Bern | | |
| 1936–1937 | CA Paris-Charenton | 17 | (9) |
| 1939–1940 | FC La Chaux-de-Fonds | | |
| 1940–1942 | FC Basel | 23 | (3) |

International career
| 1933–1934 | Switzerland | 4 | (2) |
- * Club domestic league appearances and goals

Joseph Bossi or Giuseppe Bossi (born 29 August 1911; date of death unknown) was a Swiss footballer who played for Switzerland in the 1934 FIFA World Cup. Bossi is deceased.

== Club career ==
Having first played for Lausanne-Sport, Bossi moved on to play for FC Bern during the winter break of the 1933–34 Nationalliga season. He played in Bern for two and a half seasons and then joined CA Paris-Charenton. He returned to Switzerland after one season and played one season for La Chaux-de-Fonds.

Bossi joined FC Basel's first team for their 1940–41 season under head coach Eugen Rupf. Despite having been 1st League champions the previous season, Basel played this season in the 1st League as well, because there had been no promotion to the top tier of Swiss football due to World War II. This season, however, two promotions were planned. Bossi played his domestic league debut for the club in the away game on 8 September 1940 as Basel won 3–1 against Fribourg. He scored his first goal for his club on 27 October in the home game in the Landhof as Basel won 4–3 against local rivals Old Boys. Bossi scored his first league goal for his club on 22 December as Basel won 2–1 in the return game against Fribourg. Bossi played in 13 of the club's 14 league matches and Basel won the 1. Liga group and advanced to the finals. But in the promotion play-offs Basel were defeated by Cantonal Neuchatel and drew the game with Zürich. Their two play-off opponents were thus promoted and Basel remained for another season in the 1 Liga.

In the first half of their 1941–42 season Bossi was also a regular starter with the team. On 31 August 1941 in the first league game against SC Juventus Zürich their striker Alex Mathys scored seven goals as Basel won by 10–1. There is no indication or evidence in the history books that this was not a goal scoring record for a single FCB player in a single match in the club's entire history. Bossi also scored a goal in this match. Basel finished their season as winners of group, they managed 18 victories and 3 draws from their 22 games, just one defeat. The promotion play-offs were then against group West winners FC Bern. The 1st leg was the away tie, this ended with a goalless draw. Basel won the 2nd leg at home at the Landhof 3–1 to achieve Promotion, Bossi ended his active football career.

During his two seasons with the club, Bossi played a total of 39 games for Basel scoring a total of six goals. 23 of these games were in the 1st League, eight in the Swiss Cup and eight were friendly games. He scored three goal in the domestic league, two in the cup and the other was scored during the test games.

== International career ==
Bossi made his debut for the Swiss national team on 3 December 1933 in the Stadio Comunale Giovanni Berta. He scored his first goal for his country in the same game, but it could not help the team as they lost 2–5 against Italy. This game was part of the 1933–35 Central European International Cup.

His second match was on 11 March 1934 as Switzerland won the away match 1–0 in Paris against France. The third match was 27 March, again in the 1933–35 Central European International Cup. Bossi scored a goal in this match in Charmilles Stadium in Geneva as well, but this could help the team either as they lost 2–3 against Austria.

Bossi's last game for his country was on 27 May 1934 in the 1934 FIFA World Cup final tournament. Switzerland won 3–2 against the Netherlands in the Stadio San Siro in Milan.

== Sources ==
- Rotblau: Jahrbuch Saison 2017/2018. Publisher: FC Basel Marketing AG. ISBN 978-3-7245-2189-1
- Die ersten 125 Jahre. Publisher: Josef Zindel im Friedrich Reinhardt Verlag, Basel. ISBN 978-3-7245-2305-5
- Verein "Basler Fussballarchiv" Homepage
