= Werner Wenk =

Swiss footballer (1922–2017)

Personal information
- Full name: Werner Simon Heinz Wenk
- Date of birth: 26 October 1922
- Place of birth: Switzerland
- Date of death: 25 March 2017 (aged 94)
- Position: Midfielder

Youth career
- until 1939: FC Basel

Senior career*
Years	Team	Apps	(Gls)
1939–1952	FC Basel	131	(29)
1952–1953	Cantonal Neuchatel	6	(0)
- * Club domestic league appearances and goals

Werner Simon Heinz Wenk (26 October 1922 – 25 March 2017) was a Swiss footballer who played in the 1940s and early 1950s as midfielder.

== Biography ==
Wenk played his youth football by FC Basel and advanced to their first team during their 1939–40 season. He played his domestic league debut for the club in the home game at the Landhof on 10 March 1940. He scored his first goal for his club during that game as Basel won 4–1 against local rivals FC Birsfelden. In the last game of the group stage in that season on 23 June Wenk scored a hat-trick as Basel won 6–1 against Solothurn. Basel were winners of the group stage and progressed to the play-off stage. Basel became 1. Liga champions winning the best of three final against Fribourg. August Ibach was team top league goal scorer with 19 goals, Fritz Schmidlin, Hermann Suter and Wenk himself each scored five times.

Between the years 1940 and 152 Wenk played a total of 217 games for Basel scoring a total of 48 goals. 131 of these games were in the 1. Liga and Nationalliga, 26 were in the Swiss Cup and 60 were friendly games. He scored 29 goal in the domestic league, seven in the cup and the other 12 were scored during the test games.

For the season 1952–1953 Wenk moved on to play for Cantonal Neuchatel in the Nationalliga B and then he ended his active football career.

On 4 April 2016, Wenk celebrated his 70th wedding anniversary together with his wife Elsy Wenk-Fischer at the care centre in Riehen. He died on 25 March 2017, at the age of 94.

== Sources ==
- Rotblau: Jahrbuch Saison 2017/2018. Publisher: FC Basel Marketing AG. ISBN 978-3-7245-2189-1
- Die ersten 125 Jahre. Publisher: Josef Zindel im Friedrich Reinhardt Verlag, Basel. ISBN 978-3-7245-2305-5
- Verein "Basler Fussballarchiv" Homepage
