= Fritz Lanz =

Swiss footballer

Personal information
- Full name: Fritz Lanz
- Place of birth: Switzerland
- Position: Forward

Senior career*
Years	Team	Apps	(Gls)
1939–1940	FC Basel	2	(0)
- * Club domestic league appearances and goals

Fritz Lanz was a Swiss footballer who played for FC Basel as a forward.

Lanz joined Basel's first team during their 1939–40 season under co-managers Walter Dietrich and Max Galler. Lanz made his domestic league debut for the club in the play-offs at the end of the season in the away game on 7 July 1940 as Basel played a 2–2 draw against Brühl St. Gallen. He scored his first goal for his club in the same game.

In his time with Basel Lanz played two games for the club scoring that one goal. Both of these games were in the 1 Liga play-offs.

== Sources ==
- Rotblau: Jahrbuch Saison 2017/2018. Publisher: FC Basel Marketing AG. ISBN 978-3-7245-2189-1
- Die ersten 125 Jahre. Publisher: Josef Zindel im Friedrich Reinhardt Verlag, Basel. ISBN 978-3-7245-2305-5
- Verein "Basler Fussballarchiv" Homepage

(NB: Despite all efforts, the editors of these books and the authors in "Basler Fussballarchiv" have failed to be able to identify all the players, their date and place of birth or date and place of death, who played in the games during the early years of FC Basel)
