= Max Bosshard =

Swiss footballer

Personal information
- Full name: Max Bosshard
- Place of birth: Switzerland
- Position: Forward

Senior career*
Years	Team	Apps	(Gls)
1939–1940	FC Basel	4	(1)
- * Club domestic league appearances and goals

Max Bosshard was a Swiss footballer who played as a forward.

Bosshard joined Basel's first team in their 1939–40 season under co-managers Walter Dietrich and Max Galler. After appearing in one test match, Bossard made his domestic league debut for the club in the away game on 10 December 1939. He scored his first goal in the same game as Basel won 4–2 against Aarau.

In his season with the club he played seven games and scored twice. Four of these games were in the domestic league, one in the Swiss Cup and two were friendly games. He scored one goal in the domestic league and the other during the test games.

== Sources ==
- Rotblau: Jahrbuch Saison 2017/2018. Publisher: FC Basel Marketing AG. ISBN 978-3-7245-2189-1
- Die ersten 125 Jahre. Publisher: Josef Zindel im Friedrich Reinhardt Verlag, Basel. ISBN 978-3-7245-2305-5
- Verein "Basler Fussballarchiv" Homepage

(NB: Despite all efforts, the editors of these books and the authors in "Basler Fussballarchiv" have failed to be able to identify all the players, their date and place of birth or date and place of death, who played in the games during the early years of FC Basel)
