= Erhard Grieder =

Swiss footballer

Personal information
- Full name: Erhard Grieder
- Position: Forward

Senior career*
Years	Team	Apps	(Gls)
1941–1942	FC Basel	4	(8)
- * Club domestic league appearances and goals

Erhard Grieder was a footballer who played for FC Basel during one season in the early 1940s. He played as a forward.

Grieder joined Basel's first team during their 1941–42 season. After one test match, he made his domestic league debut for the club in the home game at the Landhof on 18 January 1942 against Schaffhausen. He scored his first goal for his club in the same game, in fact he scored five times as Basel won 11–0.

His next game was in the round of 16 in the Swiss Cup. Grieder scored a hat-trick in this game as Basel knocked Solothurn out of the competition by six goals to one. Grieder played in five cup games, including the final which ended goalless after extra time and a replay was required. Grasshopper Club won the replay.

During his six months with the club, Grieder played nine games for Basel and scored twelve goals. Three games were in the Swiss Serie A, five in the Swiss Cup and one was a friendly game. He scored eight goals in the domestic league and four in the cup.

== Sources ==
- Rotblau: Jahrbuch Saison 2017/2018. Publisher: FC Basel Marketing AG. ISBN 978-3-7245-2189-1
- Die ersten 125 Jahre. Publisher: Josef Zindel im Friedrich Reinhardt Verlag, Basel. ISBN 978-3-7245-2305-5
- Verein "Basler Fussballarchiv" Homepage
