= Henri Brinks =

Swiss footballer

Personal information
- Full name: Henri Brinks
- Position: Forward

Senior career*
Years	Team	Apps	(Gls)
1939–1940	FC Basel	4	(4)
- * Club domestic league appearances and goals

Henri Brinks was a footballer who played one season for FC Basel as a forward.

Brinks joined their first team in their 1939–40 season under co-managers Walter Dietrich and Max Galler. After appearing in four test matches, he made his domestic league debut for the club in the home game at the Landhof on 3 December 1939. He scored his first two goals in the same game as Basel won 5–0 against Solothurn.

In his one season with the club, Brinks played eleven games for Basel scoring five goals. Four of these games were in the Swiss Serie A, two in the Swiss Cup and five were friendly games. He scored four goals in the domestic league, the other was scored during the test games.

== Sources ==
- Rotblau: Jahrbuch Saison 2017/2018. Publisher: FC Basel Marketing AG. ISBN 978-3-7245-2189-1
- Die ersten 125 Jahre. Publisher: Josef Zindel im Friedrich Reinhardt Verlag, Basel. ISBN 978-3-7245-2305-5
- Verein "Basler Fussballarchiv" Homepage

(NB: Despite all efforts, the editors of these books and the authors in "Basler Fussballarchiv" have failed to be able to identify all the players, their date and place of birth or date and place of death, who played in the games during the early years of FC Basel)
