= 1940–41 Nationalliga =

Swiss football season

Nationalliga
- Season: 1940–41
- Dates: 8 September 1940 to 8 June 1941
- Champions: Lugano
- Relegated: None
- Matches: 182
- Top goalscorer: Alessandro Frigerio (Lugano); 26 goals

The following is the summary of the Swiss National League in the 1940–41 football season. This was the 44th season of top-tier football in Switzerland.

== Overview ==
=== Preamble ===
In Switzerland during the second world war, sport became an integral part of the "spiritual national defense". This was a political and cultural movement that had already become increasingly important during the late 1930s. Politicians, intellectuals and media professionals had increasingly called for measures to strengthen Switzerland's basic cultural values. Since the Nationalliga games were also considered to be one of the activities that seemed important for maintaining the morale of the population, the military authorities put considerably fewer obstacles in the way of the top players as they had during the previous World War. However, in 1941, the "Lex Zumbühl", named after the Football Association's president, formally banned professional football players. In addition to this, the number of foreign players allowed to play was to be reduced from three to one per team.

=== Format ===
At this time, the Swiss Football Association (ASF/SFV) had 12 member clubs in the top-tier and 24 members in the second-tier. The 12 top-tier teams played a double round-robin to decide their league table positions. Two points were awarded for a win and one point was awarded for a draw. The first placed team at the end of the season would be awarded the Swiss championship title. Once again there was no relegation from the Nationalliga, although this time not because of the special circumstances of the war championship, as in the previous year, but as a result of the decision to increase the league to 14 teams. The two additional places were played out between the three group winners of the 1940–41 1. Liga.

== Nationalliga ==
The league season began with the first matchday on 8 September 1940 and was concluded with the last round on 8 June 1941.

=== Teams, locations ===
Team	Based in	Canton	Stadium	Capacity
FC Biel-Bienne	Biel/Bienne	Bern	Stadion Gurzelen	5,500
Grasshopper Club Zürich	Zürich	Zürich	Hardturm	20,000
FC Grenchen	Grenchen	Solothurn	Stadium Brühl	15,100
FC La Chaux-de-Fonds	La Chaux-de-Fonds	Neuchâtel	Centre Sportif de la Charrière	12,700
FC Lausanne-Sport	Lausanne	Vaud	Pontaise	30,000
FC Lugano	Lugano	Ticino	Cornaredo Stadium	6,330
FC Luzern	Lucerne	Lucerne	Stadion Allmend	25,000
FC Nordstern Basel	Basel	Basel-Stadt	Rankhof	7,600
Servette FC	Geneva	Geneva	Stade des Charmilles	27,000
FC St. Gallen	St. Gallen	St. Gallen	Espenmoos	11,000
Young Boys	Bern	Bern	Wankdorf Stadium	56,000
FC Young Fellows	Zürich	Zürich	Utogrund	2,850

=== Final league table ===
Pos	Team	Pld	W	D	L	GF	GA	GD	Pts	Qualification or relegation
1	Lugano	22	17	3	2	57	16	+41	37	Swiss champions
2	Young Boys	22	15	5	2	50	9	+41	35	
3	Servette	22	15	3	4	55	27	+28	33	
4	Grasshopper Club	22	13	3	6	46	31	+15	29	Swiss Cup winners
5	Lausanne-Sport	22	11	2	9	34	17	+17	24	
6	Grenchen	22	8	8	6	36	28	+8	24	
7	Nordstern Basel	22	6	4	12	30	57	−27	16	
8	Young Fellows Zürich	22	5	5	12	27	36	−9	15	
9	Luzern	22	5	4	13	26	52	−26	14	
10	Biel-Bienne	22	5	4	13	23	48	−25	14	
11	La Chaux-de-Fonds	22	5	2	15	35	54	−19	12	
12	St. Gallen	22	5	1	16	26	70	−44	11	

Source: rsssf.com
Rules for classification: 1) Points; 2) Goal difference within the league, however with play-off for qualifiers;

No relegation. 14 teams in Nationalliga 1941–42.

=== Results ===
Home \ Away	BB	CDF	GRA	GRE	LS	LUG	LUZ	NOR	SER	STG	YB	YFZ
Biel-Bienne		3–1	0–1	0–3	2–7	1–3	2–2	1–0	0–1	5–1	0–0	0–0
La Chaux-de-Fonds	1–2		1–4	3–3	0–1	1–2	6–2	1–1	1–3	7–0	1–3	3–1
Grasshopper Club	3–1	1–0		1–1	1–0	1–2	3–0	1–1	1–5	4–1	0–4	5–2
Grenchen	1–1	4–1	1–2		0–1	1–1	2–2	3–0	2–1	1–2	0–0	1–0
Lausanne-Sports	5–1	0–1	5–0	3–0		0–1	0–1	0–1	0–0	4–0	0–1	2–1
Lugano	5–0	4–0	2–1	3–1	1–0		2–3	1–1	2–0	4–0	1–0	3–0
Luzern	2–0	3–0	1–3	1–3	0–1	0–3		0–1	2–3	0–0	0–6	0–3
Nordstern	1–0	9–3	0–6	1–2	1–3	1–7	2–5		4–0	3–2	0–3	0–2
Servette	4–0	2–1	1–1	2–1	2–0	4–2	5–1	8–0		6–2	0–2	2–2
St. Gallen	1–0	4–2	1–5	0–3	1–2	1–6	3–1	4–1	0–1		1–5	0–1
Young Boys	5–0	2–0	1–0	1–1	2–0	0–0	0–0	4–1	2–3	4–1		2–0
Young Fellows	1–4	0–1	1–2	2–2	0–0	0–2	4–0	1–1	1–2	5–1	0–3	

Source: rsssf.com
Legend: Blue = home team win; Yellow = draw; Red = away team win.

=== Topscorers ===
Rank	Player	Nat.	Goals	Club
1.	Alessandro Frigerio	(Switzerland)	26	Lugano
2.	Lauro Amadò	(Switzerland)	21	Grasshopper Club
3.	Willy Bernhard	(Switzerland)	20	Young Boys

== Further in Swiss football ==
- 1940–41 Swiss Cup
- 1940–41 Swiss 1. Liga

== Sources ==
- Switzerland 1940–41 at RSSSF

Preceded by 1939–40	Nationalliga seasons in Switzerland	Succeeded by 1941–42
