= Ernst Kipfer =

Swiss footballer (1915-2016)

Personal information
- Full name: Ernst Kipfer
- Date of birth: 3 November 1915
- Place of birth: Basel, Switzerland
- Date of death: 7 February 2016 (aged 100)
- Place of death: Allschwil, Switzerland
- Position: Goalkeeper

Senior career*
Years	Team	Apps	(Gls)
1935–1937	Basel	1	(0)
1937–1939	Lausanne-Sport		
1940–1933	Basel	8	(0)
- * Club domestic league appearances and goals

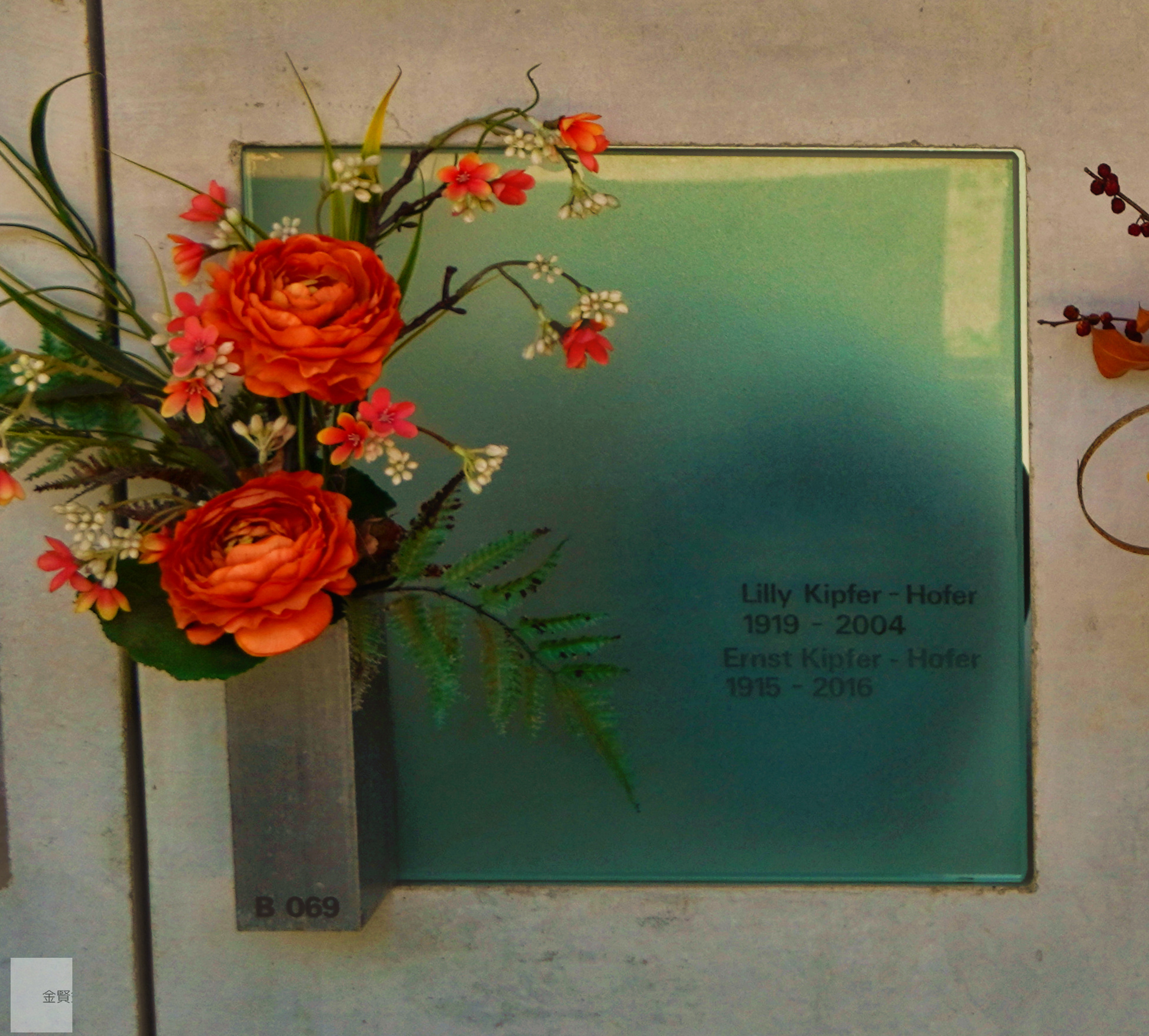
urn grave of Ernst Kipfer on the Friedhof am Hörnli, Riehen BS

Ernst Kipfer (3 November 1915 – 7 February 2016) was a Swiss footballer who played for FC Basel and Lausanne-Sport. He played as goalkeeper.

== Career ==
Kipfer joined FC Basel's first team as reserve goalkeeper in their 1935–36 season. He had one appearance in a test match in August 1935 and played his domestic league debut for the club in the home game at the Landhof on 6 September 1936 as Basel were defeated 0–5 by Biel-Bienne. He was substituted in at half time for Eugène de Kalbermatten. This was his only game for the club at that time.

He moved to Lausanne-Sport in 1937 and signed a professional contract. He was about to move to the Racing Club Strasbourg and played in a test game against Racing Paris, but a short time later, the outbreak of the Second World War prevented this transfer.

Kipfer re-joined the first team again in their 1940–41 season under head coach Eugen Rupf. Between the years 1936 and 1943 he played a total of 13 games for Basel. Nine of these games were in the Nationalliga, one in the Swiss Cup and the other three were friendly games.

== Private life ==
Born in Basel, Kipfer grew up in the Matthäus district to the north of the city. His father was the owner of the carpentry business in the Oetlingerstrasse, where Ernst also worked later. In addition to school, which he said wasn't really his thing, he was particularly influenced by sport. Not just as gymnast with the local gymnastic club (TV Kleinbasel), but also goalkeeper for FC Basel and for the TVKB handball team in the Nati 1. In 1939 he moved to France, but as soon as he arrived, he had to return, because the war had broken out. He refused to pursue a career in the army and looked after the business at home, which he had to take over following his father's early death.

Kipfer always remained member to the gymnastic club, he was made an honorary member in 1957 and was honoured for 80 years of club membership in 2012.

Kipfer also remained closely connected to the FCB as club member and interested supporter right up until he died at his home in Allschwil on 3 November 1915.

== Sources ==
- Josef Zindel (2018). FC Basel 1893. Die ersten 125 Jahre (in German). Basel: Friedrich Reinhardt Verlag. ISBN 978-3-7245-2305-5.
- Rotblau: Jahrbuch Saison 2017/2018. Publisher: FC Basel Marketing AG. ISBN 978-3-7245-2189-1
- Verein "Basler Fussballarchiv" Homepage
- Michael Heim (2015). Der Kleinbasler (PDF) (in German). Basel: Turnverein Kleinbasel.
