= Hermann Suter (footballer) =

Swiss footballer (1920-2005)

Personal information
- Full name: Hermann Suter
- Date of birth: 17 April 1920
- Place of birth: Switzerland
- Date of death: 22 August 2005 (aged 85)
- Positions: Striker; midfielder

Youth career
- until 1939: FC Basel

Senior career*
Years	Team	Apps	(Gls)
1939–1949	FC Basel	148	(60)
1949–1950	Young Fellows Zürich	3	(0)
1956–1959	FC Basel	46	(18)
- * Club domestic league appearances and goals

Hermann Suter (17 April 1920 - 22 August 2005) was a Swiss footballer who played for FC Basel in the 1940s and 1950s. He also played one season for Young Fellows Zürich. He played mainly as a striker, but also as a midfielder.

Suter played his youth football by Basel and joined their first team in their 1939–40 season under first team co-managers Walter Dietrich and Max Galler. After appearing in three test matches, he played his domestic league debut for the club in the home game at the Landhof on 3 December 1939. He scored his first goal in the same game as Basel won 5–0 against Solothurn.

During the season Suter played five games in the group stage and four in the championship play-offs. He scored five goals, including one in the play-off final against Fribourg as Basel won 2–1 to become 1 Liga champions. Although Basel won the championship that season, there was no relegation and no promotion due to the second World War.

Again in the 1940–41 season Basel won their 1 Liga group, but in the promotion play-offs Basel were defeated by Cantonal Neuchatel and drew the game with Zürich. Their two play-off opponents were thus promoted and Basel remained for another season in the 1 Liga. August Ibach was the team's top league goal scorer that season with 15 goals. Suter scored nine times and Fritz Schmidlin scored eight times. In the Swiss Cup match on 12 January 1941 Suter scored his first hat-trick for his team as they drew 3–3 with Nordstern Basel.

In the season 1941–42 Basel were winners of the 1 Liga group East and therefore played a play-off for promotion of the 1 Liga group West, FC Bern. After a goalless first leg away from home, Basel won the return leg 3–1 and achieved promotion. Suter scored one of the Basel goals in this return leg. Rodolfo Kappenberger was the team's top league goal scorer with 15 goals, player-manager Eugen Rupf scored 14 goals and Suter was third best scorer with 12 goals. In this same season Suter with Basel also qualified for the Swiss Cup final. This ended goalless after extra time and thus a replay was required. The replay was on 25 May in the Wankdorf Stadion. Basel led by half time 2–0, Schmidlin had scored both goals, but two goals from Grubenmann a third from Neukom gave the Grasshoppers a 3–2 victory. Basel narrowly missed the sensation.

Following their promotion Basel played two mediocre seasons, but staying clear of relegation. Suter played regularly. However, in the season 1944–45 Suter and his team were again relegated, from the newly arranged Nationalliga A to the Nationalliga B. Suter played only four league games this season.

But the team achieved immediate promotion as 1945–46 Nationalliga B champions a year later. Under trainer Max Barras the team dominated the Nationalliga B that season, in 26 games they won 19, drew five and lost only twice. With 43 points they won the championship four points ahead of Urania Genève Sport, who were also promoted, and eight points ahead of third placed St. Gallen.

There were fourteen teams contesting in the 1946–47 Nationalliga A, the bottom two teams in the table to be relegated. Basel finished their season in fourth position in the table, with twelve victories from 26 games, scoring in total 60 goals. Traugott Oberer was the team's top goal scorer. René Bader and Hermann Suter were joint second best, each with 10 goals. FC Biel-Bienne won the championship.

Basel advanced to the Swiss Cup-Final, which was played in the Stadion Neufeld in Bern on 7 April 1947. Basel won the final 3–0 against Lausanne Sport and thus their second cup title. In the Final Paul Stöcklin scored two goals and Bader the other. The team's new manager Anton Schall led Basel to win the Cup, but he died shortly afterwards at the age of 40 years during a workout on the football field. Following this unhappy event, team captain Ernst Hufschmid later took over as player-manager.

Between the years 1939–1949 and then again between 1956–1959 Hermann Suter played a total of 301 games for Basel scoring a total of 129 goals. 194 of these games were in the Nationalliga A or 1. Liga, 35 in the Swiss Cup and 72 were friendly games. He scored 79 goal in the domestic league, 25 in the Swiss Cup and the other 25 were scored during the test games.

== Sources ==
- Rotblau: Jahrbuch Saison 2017/2018. Publisher: FC Basel Marketing AG. ISBN 978-3-7245-2189-1
- Die ersten 125 Jahre. Publisher: Josef Zindel im Friedrich Reinhardt Verlag, Basel. ISBN 978-3-7245-2305-5
- Verein "Basler Fussballarchiv" Homepage
