= Paul Wechlin =

Swiss footballer (1920-2013)

Personal information
- Full name: Paul Wechlin
- Date of birth: 10 February 1920
- Place of birth: Basel Switzerland
- Date of death: 4 July 2013 (aged 93)
- Place of death: Basel Switzerland
- Position: Goalkeeper

Youth career
- 1934–1939: FC Basel

Senior career*
Years	Team	Apps	(Gls)
1939–1949	FC Basel	52	(0)
- * Club domestic league appearances and goals

Paul Wechlin (10 February 1920 - 4 July 2013) was a Swiss footballer who played for FC Basel. He played as goalkeeper.

== Football career ==
Wechlin played his youth football by FC Basel and joined the first team during their 1939–40 season under first team co-managers Walter Dietrich and Max Galler. He played his domestic league debut for the club in the away game on 10 September 1939 as Basel won 4–2 against Aarau.

During his time with Basel he shared the goalkeeping in the beginning with Kurt Imhof and Silvio Cinguetti later with Walter Müller. Between the years 1939 and 1949 Wechlin played a total of 80 games for Basel. 52 of these games were in the Nationalliga and 1. Liga, seven in the Swiss Cup and 21 were friendly games.

== Private life ==
As was customary at that time, the players were amateurs and pursued a civil profession. Wechlin worked as a sign painter and later as a painter and decorator. After his active football career he served as referee until 1970. Welchlin lived all his life in the district Wettstein in Kleinbasel, close to Basels home stadium Landhof.

== Sources ==
- Rotblau: Jahrbuch Saison 2017/2018. Publisher: FC Basel Marketing AG. ISBN 978-3-7245-2189-1
- Die ersten 125 Jahre. Publisher: Josef Zindel im Friedrich Reinhardt Verlag, Basel. ISBN 978-3-7245-2305-5
- Verein "Basler Fussballarchiv" Homepage
