= 1940–41 Swiss 1. Liga =

1. Liga
- Season: 1940–41
- Champions: 1. Liga champions: Zürich; Group West winners: Cantonal Neuchâtel; Group Central winners: Basel; Group East winners: Zürich
- Promoted: Zürich; Cantonal Neuchâtel
- Relegated: none
- Matches: 3x 56 plus 3 play-offs

The 1940–41 1. Liga season was the 9th season of the 1. Liga since its creation in 1931. At this time, the 1. Liga was the second-tier of the Swiss football league system.

== Overview ==
In Switzerland during the second world war period, sport became an integral part of the "spiritual national defense". This was a political and cultural movement that had already become increasingly important during the late 1930s. Politicians, intellectuals and media professionals had increasingly called for measures to strengthen Switzerland's basic cultural values. Since the Nationalliga games were also considered to be one of the activities that seemed important for maintaining the morale of the population, the military authorities put considerably fewer obstacles in the way of the top players and leading clubs as they had during the previous World War. However, in 1941, the "Lex Zumbühl", named after the Swiss Football Association (ASF/SFV) president, formally banned professional football players. In addition to this, the number of foreign players allowed to play was reduced from three to one per team.

== Format ==
There were 24 clubs competing in the 1. Liga this season. They were divided into three regional groups, each with eight teams. Within each group, the teams would play a double round-robin to decide their league position. Two points were awarded for a win and one point was awarded for a draw. Last season had seen no promotions to the top tier, due to World War II. This season, however, two promotions were planned. The three group winners contested a play-off round to decide the 1. Liga championship and the two promotion slots to the Nationalliga. However, this season would see no relegations because the Nationalliga was to be expanded from 12 to 14 clubs next season. There was to be three promotions from the 2. Liga (third tier) this season, therefore there would be one more club in this division in the next season.

== Group West ==
=== Teams, locations ===
Club	Based in	Canton	Stadium	Capacity
FC Cantonal Neuchâtel	Neuchâtel	Neuchâtel	Stade de la Maladière	25,500
Dopolavoro Genève	Genève	Geneva		
FC Étoile-Sporting	La Chaux-de-Fonds	Neuchâtel	Les Foulets / Terrain des Eplatures	1,000 / 500
FC Montreux-Sports	Montreux	Vaud	Stade de Chailly	1,000
FC Forward Morges	Morges	Vaud	Parc des Sports	600
FC Monthey	Monthey	Valais	Stade Philippe Pottier	1,800
Urania Genève Sport	Genève	Geneva	Stade de Frontenex	4,000
Vevey Sports	Vevey	Vaud	Stade de Copet	4,000

=== Final league table ===
Pos	Team	Pld	W	D	L	GF	GA	GD	Pts	Qualification or relegation
1	FC Cantonal Neuchâtel	14	12	1	1	50	13	+37	25	To promotion play-off
2	FC Étoile-Sporting	14	9	3	2	47	29	+18	21	
3	Urania Genève Sport	14	9	2	3	31	21	+10	20	
4	Vevey Sports	14	7	1	6	36	28	+8	15	
5	FC Monthey	14	3	4	7	19	37	−18	10	
6	Dopolavoro Genève	14	3	3	8	19	24	−5	9	
7	FC Forward Morges	14	2	4	8	14	31	−17	8	
8	FC Montreux-Sports	14	1	2	11	14	47	−33	4	

Source: RSSSF
Rules for classification: 1) Points; 2) Goal difference within the league, but decider play-off for qualifiers.

== Group Central ==
=== Teams, locations ===
Club	Based in	Canton	Stadium	Capacity
FC Aarau	Aarau	Aargau	Stadion Brügglifeld	9,240
FC Basel	Basel	Basel-Stadt	Landhof	4,000
FC Bern	Bern	Bern	Stadion Neufeld	14,000
US Bienne-Boujean	Biel/Bienne	Bern		
FC Birsfelden	Birsfelden	Basel-Landschaft	Sternenfeld	9,400
FC Concordia Basel	Basel	Basel-Stadt	Stadion Rankhof	7,000
FC Fribourg	Fribourg	Fribourg	Stade Universitaire	9,000
FC Solothurn	Solothurn	Solothurn	Stadion FC Solothurn	6,750

=== Final league table ===
Pos	Team	Pld	W	D	L	GF	GA	GD	Pts	Qualification
1	Basel	14	11	2	1	44	19	+25	24	To promotion play-off
2	Aarau	14	11	1	2	37	10	+27	23	
3	FC Bern	14	8	3	3	34	24	+10	19	
4	Solothurn	14	5	2	7	35	30	+5	12	
5	Birsfelden	14	4	3	7	17	27	−10	11	
6	Concordia Basel	14	3	3	8	23	40	−17	9	
7	Fribourg	14	3	1	10	20	35	−15	7	
8	US Bienne-Boujean	14	2	3	9	18	43	−25	7	

Source: RSSSF
Rules for classification: 1) Points; 2) Goal difference within the league, but decider play-off for qualifiers.

== Group East ==
=== Teams, locations ===
Club	Based in	Canton	Stadium	Capacity
AC Bellinzona	Bellinzona	Ticino	Stadio Comunale Bellinzona	5,000
FC Blue Stars Zürich	Zürich	Zürich	Hardhof	1,000
SC Brühl	St. Gallen	St. Gallen	Paul-Grüninger-Stadion	4,200
FC Chiasso	Chiasso	Ticino	Stadio Comunale Riva IV	4,000
SC Juventus Zürich	Zürich	Zürich	Utogrund	2,850
FC Locarno	Locarno	Ticino	Stadio comunale Lido	5,000
SC Zug	Zug	Zug	Herti Allmend Stadion	6,000
FC Zürich	Zürich	Zürich	Letzigrund	25,000

=== Final league table ===
Pos	Team	Pld	W	D	L	GF	GA	GD	Pts	Qualification or relegation
1	FC Zürich	14	11	2	1	65	10	+55	24	To promotion play-off
2	AC Bellinzona	14	9	3	2	37	18	+19	21	
3	FC Locarno	14	8	2	4	31	30	+1	18	
4	SC Brühl	14	7	2	5	34	19	+15	16	
5	FC Blue Stars Zürich	14	7	2	5	31	19	+12	16	
6	FC Chiasso	14	5	1	8	16	37	−21	11	
7	SC Zug	14	2	2	10	17	48	−31	6	
8	SC Juventus Zürich	14	0	0	14	15	65	−50	0	

Source: RSSSF
Rules for classification: 1) Points; 2) Goal difference within the league, but decider play-off for qualifiers.

== Promotion ==
The three group winners played a single round-robin for the title of 1. Liga champions and for the two promotion slots to the 1941–42 Nationalliga. The games were played on 25 May, 8 and 15 June 1941

=== Promotion play-off ===
Pos	Team	Pld	W	D	L	GF	GA	GD	Pts	FCZ	CN	BAS
1	Zürich	2	1	1	0	7	2	+5	3	—	6–1	—
2	Cantonal Neuchâtel	2	1	0	1	3	7	−4	2	—	—	2–1
3	Basel	2	0	1	1	2	3	−1	1	1–1	—	—

Source: RSSSF
Rules for classification: 1) Points; 2) Head-to-head 3) Decider.

Zürich won the 1. Liga championship title and together with runners-up Cantonal Neuchâtel were promoted to the top-tier. Basel remained in the division for the next season.

== Further in Swiss football ==
- 1941–42 Nationalliga
- 1941–42 Swiss Cup
- 1940–41 FC Basel season

== Sources ==
- Switzerland 1940–41 at RSSSF

Preceded by 1939–40	Seasons in Swiss 1. Liga	Succeeded by 1941–42
