= Walter Schmidlin =

Swiss footballer

Personal information
- Full name: Walter Schmidlin
- Place of birth: Switzerland
- Position: Midfielder

Senior career*
Years	Team	Apps	(Gls)
1935–1936	FC Basel	1	(0)
1939–1940	FC Basel	2	(0)
- * Club domestic league appearances and goals

Walter Schmidlin was a Swiss footballer. He played as midfielder.

Schmidlin joined FC Basel's first team for the first time during their 1935–36 season. He played his domestic league debut for the club in the home game at the Landhof on 19 April 1936 as Basel were defeated 2–3 by Lugano. This was his only game for the club for some time.

Schmidlin joined Basel's first team again in their 1939–40 season. Between the years 1935 and 1940 Schmidlin played a total of four games for Basel. three of these games were in the Nationalliga was a friendly game.

== Sources ==
- Rotblau: Jahrbuch Saison 2017/2018. Publisher: FC Basel Marketing AG. ISBN 978-3-7245-2189-1
- Die ersten 125 Jahre. Publisher: Josef Zindel im Friedrich Reinhardt Verlag, Basel. ISBN 978-3-7245-2305-5
- Verein "Basler Fussballarchiv" Homepage
