= Hans Studer =

Swiss footballer

Personal information
- Full name: Hans Studer
- Date of birth: unknown
- Place of birth: Switzerland
- Date of death: unknown
- Position: Midfielder

Senior career*
Years	Team	Apps	(Gls)
1939–1942	FC Basel	3	(0)
- * Club domestic league appearances and goals

Hans Studer was a Swiss footballer. He played as midfielder.

Studer joined Basel's first team in their 1939–40 season under first team co-managers Walter Dietrich and Max Galler. After appearing in three test games, Studer played his domestic league debut for the club in the away game on 10 December 1939 as Basel won 4–2 against Aarau.

In his three seasons with the club he played a total of eight games for Basel without scoring a goal. Three of these games were in the 1. Liga and five were friendly games.

== Sources ==
- Rotblau: Jahrbuch Saison 2017/2018. Publisher: FC Basel Marketing AG. ISBN 978-3-7245-2189-1
- Die ersten 125 Jahre. Publisher: Josef Zindel im Friedrich Reinhardt Verlag, Basel. ISBN 978-3-7245-2305-5
- Verein "Basler Fussballarchiv" Homepage

(NB: Despite all efforts, the editors of these books and the authors in "Basler Fussballarchiv" have failed to be able to identify all the players, their date and place of birth or date and place of death, who played in the games during the early years of FC Basel)
