= Andreas Kränzlin =

German footballer

Personal information
- Full name: Andreas Kränzlin
- Date of birth: unknown
- Place of birth: Germany
- Date of death: unknown
- Position: Midfielder

Senior career*
| Years | Team | Apps | (Gls) |
| 1939–1941 | FC Basel | 16 | (0) |
- * Club domestic league appearances and goals

Andreas Kränzlin was a German footballer who played two seasons for FC Basel as midfielder at the beginning of the 1940s.

Kränzlin joined Basel's first team in their 1939–40 season under first team co-managers Walter Dietrich and Max Galler. After appearing in three test matches, he played his domestic league debut for the club in the home game at the Landhof on 3 December 1939 as Basel won 5–0 against Solothurn.

In his time with Basel Kränzlin played a total of 28 games for the club without scoring a goal. 16 of these games were in the 1 Liga, three in the Swiss Cup and nine were friendly games.

== Sources ==
- Rotblau: Jahrbuch Saison 2017/2018. Publisher: FC Basel Marketing AG. ISBN 978-3-7245-2189-1
- Die ersten 125 Jahre. Publisher: Josef Zindel im Friedrich Reinhardt Verlag, Basel. ISBN 978-3-7245-2305-5
- Verein "Basler Fussballarchiv" Homepage

(NB: Despite all efforts, the editors of these books and the authors in "Basler Fussballarchiv" have failed to be able to identify all the players, their date and place of birth or date and place of death, who played in the games during the early years of FC Basel)
