= Walter Zürrer (footballer, born 1916) =

Swiss footballer

Personal information
- Full name: Walter Zürrer
- Date of birth: 7 September 1916
- Place of birth: Switzerland
- Date of death: 1968 (aged 51–52)
- Position: Striker

Senior career*
Years	Team	Apps	(Gls)
1938–1940	FC Basel	3	(0)
- * Club domestic league appearances and goals

Walter Zürrer (7 September 1916 – 1968) was a Swiss footballer who played for FC Basel in the late 1930s as a striker.

Zürrer joined Basel's first team during their 1938–39 season. He played his domestic league debut for the club in the away game on 12 March 1939 as Basel drew 1–1 with Young Boys.

Between the years 1938 and 1940 Zürrer played three games for Basel. Two of these games were in the Nationallige and one was in the 1. Liga after the team's relegation.

== Sources ==
- Rotblau: Jahrbuch Saison 2017/2018. Publisher: FC Basel Marketing AG. ISBN 978-3-7245-2189-1
- Die ersten 125 Jahre. Publisher: Josef Zindel im Friedrich Reinhardt Verlag, Basel. ISBN 978-3-7245-2305-5
- Verein "Basler Fussballarchiv" Homepage
