= Henri Bernard (footballer) =

Swiss footballer (1914-1942)

Personal information
- Full name: Henri Bernard
- Date of birth: 10 March 1914
- Place of birth: Switzerland
- Date of death: 3 July 1942 (aged 28)
- Position: Defender

Senior career*
Years	Team	Apps	(Gls)
1938–1942	FC Basel	40	(1)
- * Club domestic league appearances and goals

Henri Bernard (10 March 1914 – 3 July 1942) was a Swiss footballer who played for FC Basel. He played as defender.

Bernard joined Basel's first team in their 1938–39 season. He played his domestic league debut for the club in the away game on 11 December 1938 as Basel were defeated 0–2 by La Chaux-de-Fonds. He scored his first goal for his club on 18 May 1939 in the home game at the Landhof against Lugano as Basel won 7–0.

Between the years 1938 and his death in 1942 Bernard played a total of 53 games for Basel scoring that one single goal. 40 of these games were in the Nationaliga or 1. Liga, six in the Swiss Cup and seven were friendly games.

== Sources ==
- Rotblau: Jahrbuch Saison 2017/2018. Publisher: FC Basel Marketing AG. ISBN 978-3-7245-2189-1
- Die ersten 125 Jahre. Publisher: Josef Zindel im Friedrich Reinhardt Verlag, Basel. ISBN 978-3-7245-2305-5
- Verein "Basler Fussballarchiv" Homepage
