= Albert Mohler (footballer) =

Swiss footballer

Personal information
- Full name: Albert Mohler
- Place of birth: Switzerland
- Position: Midfielder

Senior career*
Years	Team	Apps	(Gls)
1938–1942	FC Basel	4	(0)
1942–1943	Nordstern Basel	3	(0)
- * Club domestic league appearances and goals

Albert Mohler was a Swiss footballer who played as midfielder in the 1930s and 1940s.

Mohler joined Basel's first team in their 1938–39 season. He played his domestic league debut for the club in the home game at the Landhof on 4 September 1938 as Basel played a 2–2 draw against La Chaux-de-Fonds.

Between the years 1938 and 1942 Mohler played a total of seven games for Basel. Four of these games were in the Nationalliga and 1. Liga and the other three were friendly games.

After his time by Basel Mohler moved on and joined FC Nordstern Basel for their 1942–1943 season in the Nationalliga A.

== Sources ==
- Rotblau: Jahrbuch Saison 2017/2018. Publisher: FC Basel Marketing AG. ISBN 978-3-7245-2189-1
- Die ersten 125 Jahre. Publisher: Josef Zindel im Friedrich Reinhardt Verlag, Basel. ISBN 978-3-7245-2305-5
- Verein "Basler Fussballarchiv" Homepage

(NB: Despite all efforts, the editors of these books and the authors in "Basler Fussballarchiv" have failed to be able to identify all the players, their date and place of birth or date and place of death, who played in the games during the early years of FC Basel)
