= Kurt Imhof =

Swiss footballer (born 1914)

Personal information
- Full name: Kurt Imhof
- Date of birth: 1914
- Place of birth: Switzerland
- Date of death: Unknown
- Position: Goalkeeper

Senior career*
Years	Team	Apps	(Gls)
1932–1935	Basel	66	(0)
1935–1936	FC Kreuzlingen		
1936–1937	Nordstern		
1938–1947	Basel	24	(0)
- * Club domestic league appearances and goals

Kurt Imhof (* 1914; † unknown) was a Swiss footballer who played for FC Basel. He played in the position of goalkeeper.

Between the years 1932 and 1935 and again between 1938 and 1947 Imhof played a total of 128 games for Basel. 85 of these games were in the Swiss Nationalliga, five were in the 1 Liga (second highest tier) and 15 were in the Swiss Cup. The other 22 were friendly games.

He was a member of the Basel team that won the Swiss Cup in the 1932–33 season. The final was played in the Hardturm stadium against Grasshopper Club. Basel won 4–3 and achieved the club's first ever national title.

== Honours ==
- Swiss Cup winner: 1932–33

== Sources ==
- Rotblau: Jahrbuch Saison 2017/2018. Publisher: FC Basel Marketing AG. ISBN 978-3-7245-2189-1
- Verein "Basler Fussballarchiv" Homepage
