= August Ibach =

Swiss footballer (1918-1988)

Personal information
- Full name: August "Gusti" Ibach
- Date of birth: 1918
- Date of death: 26 October 1988 (aged 69–70)
- Positions: Midfielder; defender

Youth career
- FC Basel

Senior career*
Years	Team	Apps	(Gls)
1935–1941	FC Basel	79	(47)
1941–1957	Biel-Bienne	245	(26)

International career
1946–1948	Switzerland	1	(0)
- * Club domestic league appearances and goals

August "Gusti" Ibach (1918 – 26 October 1988) was a Swiss footballer who played for FC Basel. He played mainly as midfielder, but also as defender and sometimes as forward.

Ibach played youth football by FC Basel. He joined their first team at the beginning of their 1935–36 season. But he did not play his domestic league debut until the end of that season. This was in the home game at the Landhof on 10 May 1936 as Basel played a 1–1 draw with Young Boys. He scored his first goal for his club in the very next game a week later. It was the very last game of the season, on 17 May, an away game against Servette. It was the first goal of the game which ended in a 2–2 draw.

Ibach played six seasons for Basel. In the season 1938/39 Ibach and his team suffered relegation to the 1 Liga. Although Basel were 1 Liga champions the following season, there was no relegation and no promotion due to the second World War. Again in the 1940/41 season Basel won their 1 Liga group, but in the promotion play-offs Basel were defeated by Cantonal Neuchatel and drew the game with Zürich. Their two play-off opponents were thus promoted and Basel remained for another season in the 1 Liga. Ibach left Basel at the end of this season.

Between the years 1935 and 1941 Ibach played a total of 121 games for Basel scoring a total of 81 goals. 79 of these games were in the Nationalliga, eight in the Swiss Cup and 34 were friendly games. He scored 47 goals in the domestic league, five in the cup and the other 29 were scored during the test games.

Noticeable for a midfield player was Ibach's goal scoring capability. He was the team's top league goal scorer in the 1939–40 season, with 19 goals in just 14 games. During his time with Basel, Ibach scored a hat-trick on five occasions, two were during friendly encounters, but he also achieved three hat-tricks in the Nationalliga. Two of which in the afore mentioned season. The first was on 17 December 1939 away against Concordia Basel. The second was on 21 July 1940 against Bellinzona. In the next season, in home match on 27 April 1941 Ibach scored four goals against US Bienne-Boujean as Basel won 9–1.

Ibach moved on to play for Biel-Bienne in the summer of 1941. He stayed with them for 11 years.

Ibach was called up for the Swiss national team for the first time in 1946. He played three games with their reserve squad and one match for his country's A team. This was on 21 April 1948 as Swiss lost a friendly match 4–7 in Budapest against Hungary.

== Sources ==
- Rotblau: Jahrbuch Saison 2017/2018. Publisher: FC Basel Marketing AG. ISBN 978-3-7245-2189-1
- Die ersten 125 Jahre. Publisher: Josef Zindel im Friedrich Reinhardt Verlag, Basel. ISBN 978-3-7245-2305-5
- Verein "Basler Fussballarchiv" Homepage
