= Alex Mathys =

Swiss footballer

Personal information
- Full name: Alex Mathys
- Date of birth: 1916
- Place of birth: Switzerland
- Position: Forward

Senior career*
| Years | Team | Apps | (Gls) |
| 1938–1942 | FC Basel | 39 | (18) |
| 1941–1942 | Brühl St. Gallen | | |
| 1943–1948 | FC Basel | 0 | (0) |
| 1947–1951 | Concordia Basel | 34 | (3) |
- * Club domestic league appearances and goals

Alex Mathys was a Swiss footballer who played from the late 1930s to the early 1950s. He played as a forward.

Mathys joined Basel's first team during their 1938–39 season under player-manager Fernand Jaccard. He made his domestic league debut for the club in the away game on 11 December 1938 as Basel were defeated 0–2 by La Chaux-de-Fonds. He scored his first goal for the club on 30 April 1939 in the home game at the Landhof against Lausanne-Sport. It was the winning goal as Basel won 1–0.

Mathys played three-and-a-half seasons with the club. He started in the 1941–42 season with Basel, but during the winter break he moved on to play for Brühl St. Gallen. In the 1943–44 season he returned to Basel for another three-and-a-half years. There is no indication why he played in only three test matches during this period, but this was probably due to the situation with World War II. In the winter break 1947–48 Mathys left the club again and moved on to Concordia Basel who played one tier lower, in the Nationalliga B.

Between 1938 and 1942 and again from 1943 to 1948 Mathys played 60 games for Basel and scored 26 goals; 39 games were in the Nationalliga and 1. Liga, 8 in the Swiss Cup and 13 were friendly games. Mathys scored 18 goals in the domestic league, 1 in the Cup and the others during the test games. On 31 August 1941, Mathys scored seven goals as Basel beat SC Juventus Zürich 10–1. There is no indication or evidence in the history books that this is not the goal scoring record for a single FCB player in a single match in the club's entire history.

== Sources ==
- Rotblau: Jahrbuch Saison 2017/2018. Publisher: FC Basel Marketing AG. ISBN 978-3-7245-2189-1
- Die ersten 125 Jahre. Publisher: Josef Zindel im Friedrich Reinhardt Verlag, Basel. ISBN 978-3-7245-2305-5
- Verein "Basler Fussballarchiv" Homepage
