= Eugen Rupf =

Swiss footballer (1914-2000)

Personal information
- Date of birth: 16 June 1914
- Date of death: 2000 (aged 85–86)
- Position: Forward

Senior career*
Years	Team	Apps	(Gls)
1936–1939	Grasshopper Club Zürich		

International career
1937–1938	Switzerland	6	(1)

Managerial career
- 1940–1943: Basel
- * Club domestic league appearances and goals

Eugen Rupf (16 June 1914 – 2000) was a Swiss footballer who played for Switzerland in the 1938 FIFA World Cup.

He played for Grasshopper Club Zürich. He also played three seasons for Basel as player-coach scoring 20 goals in 41 appearances. With Rupf as trainer, Basel were promoted in the season 1941–42 and reached Swiss Cup final that season.

Rupf died in 2000.
