= Fritz Schmidlin =

Swiss footballer (born 1914)

Personal information
- Full name: Fritz Schmidlin
- Date of birth: 30 November 1914
- Place of birth: Switzerland
- Position: Midfielder

Senior career*
Years	Team	Apps	(Gls)
1934–1945	FC Basel	173	(32)
- * Club domestic league appearances and goals

Fritz Schmidlin (born 30 November 1914; date of death unknown) was a Swiss footballer who played for FC Basel in the second half of the 1930s and the first half of the 1940s. He played as midfielder.

Schmidlin played his youth football by FC Basel and joined their first team before their 1934–35 season. He played his domestic league debut for the club in the away game on 10 March 1935 as Basel drew 2–2 with Etoile Carouge. He scored his first goal for his club on 26 January 1936 in the away game against Grasshopper Club. In fact he scored both goals but could not prevent his team's 2–5 defeat.

Schmidlin played eleven years for Basel. In the season 1938/39 Schmidlin and the team suffered relegation to the 1 Liga. Although Basel were 1 Liga champions the following season, there was no relegation and no promotion due to the second World War. Again in the 1940/41 season Basel won their 1 Liga group, but in the promotion play-offs Basel were defeated by Cantonal Neuchatel and drew the game with Zürich. Their two play-off opponents were thus promoted and Basel remained for another season in the 1 Liga.

In the season 1941/42 Basel were winners of the 1 Liga group East and played a play-off for promotion of the 1 Liga group West, FC Bern. After a goalless first leg away from home, Basel won the return leg 3–1 and achieved promotion. Schmidlin scored one of the Basel goals in this return leg. In this same season Schmidlin and Basel also qualified for the Swiss Cup final. This was played on 6 April 1942 in the Wankdorf Stadion against the Nationalliga team Grasshopper Club. The final ended goalless after extra time and thus a replay was required. The replay was on 25 May, again in the Wankdorf Stadion. Basel led by half time 2–0, Schmidlin had scored both goals, but two goals from Grubenmann a third from Neukom gave the Grasshoppers a 3–2 victory.

Three years later, in the season 1944/45 Schmidlin and his team were again relegated, from the newly arranged Nationalliga A to the Nationalliga B. Schmidlin ended his active career at the end of this season. But the team achieved immediate promotion as Nationalliga B champions a year later.

Between the years 1934 and 1945 Schmidlin played a total of 230 games for Basel scoring a total of 49 goals. 173 of these games were in the Nationalliga and 1st League, 18 of the games were in the Swiss Cup and 39 were friendly games. He scored 32 goals in the domestic league, eight were scored in the cup competition and the other nine were scored during the test games.

== Sources ==
- Rotblau: Jahrbuch Saison 2017/2018. Publisher: FC Basel Marketing AG. ISBN 978-3-7245-2189-1
- Die ersten 125 Jahre. Publisher: Josef Zindel im Friedrich Reinhardt Verlag, Basel. ISBN 978-3-7245-2305-5
- Verein "Basler Fussballarchiv" Homepage
