= Max Galler =

Swiss football player (1902-1970)

Personal information
- Full name: Max Galler
- Date of birth: 27 January 1902
- Place of birth: Basel, Switzerland
- Date of death: 6 January 1970 (aged 67)
- Place of death: Basel, Switzerland
- Positions: Defender; midfielder

Youth career
- until 1921: FC Basel

Senior career*
Years	Team	Apps	(Gls)
1921–1932	FC Basel	140	(2)

International career
1923–1929	Switzerland	5	(0)

Managerial career
- 1939–1940: FC Basel
- * Club domestic league appearances and goals

Max Galler (27 February 1902, in Basel – 6 January 1970, in Basel) was a Swiss footballer who played for FC Basel and the Swiss national team. He played as defender or midfielder. He later became trainer as was trainer of the Basel team for the season 1939/40.

== Football career ==
Galler played his youth football for FC Basel and advanced to their first team in 1921. He played his domestic league debut on 25 May 1922 in the home game at the Landhof against FC Bern. He scored his first goal for his club in the first game of the 1925–26 Serie A season on 6 September 1925 against Solothurn.

A well-documented curiosity was that at the end of Basel's 1929–30 season, the team set off on a Scandinavian football tour, including a visit to Germany. Six games were played in Norway, but the first was played in Leipzig. The team travelled with 15 players, their trainer Kertész and two functionaries. The journey started with a train ride on 2 June 1930 at quarter past seven in the morning from Basel and they arrived in Leipzig at half passed eight that evening. The game against VfB Leipzig was played the next evening. The following one and a half days were spent travelling by train, train, ship, train and train again to Drammen in Norway. Only a few hours after their arrival, the team played a game against a joint team Mjøndalen IF / SBK Drafn. The next day was a train journey to Porsgrunn and two matches in 24 hours. Following that they travelled per bus and then by ship in a 48-hour journey to Bergen for a match against SK Brann. Another ship voyage, this time to Stavanger, two games against Viking FK, then a ship voyage back to Bergen. Finally, the tour ended with three train journeys in three days, Bergen/Oslo/Berlin/Basel, arriving at home on 20 June. The result of this tour was seven games, four wins, one draw, two defeats and approximately 160 hours of travelling. Galler was member in this tour. He played in all seven games and scored a goal.

Galler ended his playing career after the 1931–32 Nationalliga season. His 232nd and last game for Basel was on 25 October 1931, an away game against Zürich. Between the years 1921 and 1932 Galler played a total of 232 games for Basel scoring a total of six goals. 140 of these games were in the Swiss Serie A and Nationalliga, 13 in the Swiss Cup and 79 were friendly games. He scored two goals in the domestic league, one in the cup and the other three were scored during the test games.

For the Swiss national team Galler played his debut in the Het Nederlandsch Sportpark in Amsterdam in the 1–4 defeat against the Netherlands on 25 November 1923. Galler's next four games for the national team were in the 1928/29 season. In total he played five games for his country.

After he ended his playing career he obtained his training diplom and later became trainer. He managed the Basel team during the season 1939/40. The team had suffered their first relegation during the 1938–39 Nationalliga season under manager Walter Dietrich. Galler took over as manager and led the team to win the table in the 1st League. However, due to the fact that there was neither demotions nor promotions that season the team played the next season in the 1st League as well. After one year as team manager Galler was succeeded by Eugen Rupf.

== Sources ==
- Rotblau: Jahrbuch Saison 2017/2018. Publisher: FC Basel Marketing AG. ISBN 978-3-7245-2189-1
- Die ersten 125 Jahre. Publisher: Josef Zindel im Friedrich Reinhardt Verlag, Basel. ISBN 978-3-7245-2305-5
- Verein "Basler Fussballarchiv" Homepage
