= 1938–39 BSC Young Boys season =

BSC Young Boys
1938–39 season
- Chairman: G. Marchand
- Manager: Hans Pulver
- Stadium: Stadion Wankdorf
- Nationalliga: 10th
- Swiss Cup: Round 3

The 1938–39 season was the 40th season in the history of Berner Sport Club Young Boys. The team played their home games at Stadion Wankdorf in Bern and placed 10th in the Nationalliga, and was then eliminated in the third round of the Swiss Cup.

== Players ==
- Knuchel
- Achille Siegrist
- Louis Gobet
- Otto Hänni
- Hans Liniger
- Willy Terretaz
- Aldo Poretti
- Attilio Mordasini
- Max Horisberger
- Walter Streun
- Puigventos

== Friendlies ==
Win Draw Loss

28 August 1938 Friendly	Young Boys (Switzerland)	4–4	(Switzerland) Basel	Bern
	Bickel (2x); Sydler (1x); Lukacs (1x)		Schmidlin (I) (2x); Spadini (1x); Ibach (1x)	Stadium: Stadion Wankdorf; Attendance: 1,800; Referee: Gerber

== Competitions ==
=== Overall record ===
Competition	First match	Last match	Starting round	Final position	Record							
Competition	First match	Last match	Starting round	Final position	Pld	W	D	L	GF	GA	GD	Win %
Nationalliga	4 September 1938	18 May 1939	Matchday 1	10th	22	4	9	9	22	35	−13	18.18
Swiss Cup	29 January 1939	19 February 1939	Round 1	Round 3	3	2	0	1	5	6	−1	66.67
Total					25	6	9	10	27	41	−14	24.00

Source: Competitions

=== Nationalliga ===
==== League table ====
Pos	Team	Pld	W	D	L	GF	GA	GD	Pts	Qualification or relegation
8	Luzern	22	7	5	10	42	45	−3	19	
9	Young Fellows Zürich	22	6	6	10	29	31	−2	18	
10	Young Boys	22	4	9	9	22	35	−13	17	
11	Biel-Bienne	22	4	9	9	22	39	−17	17	
12	Basel	22	5	5	12	29	36	−7	15	Relegated to 1939–40 1. Liga

Source: rsssf.com
Rules for classification: 1) Points; 2) Goal difference within the league, however with play-off for qualifiers;

==== Matches ====
4 September 1938 Round 1	Young Boys	1–5	FC Nordstern Basel	Bern
				Stadium: Stadion Wankdorf; Attendance: 2,500; Referee: (Switzerland) Ferdinand Allemann

11 September 1938 Round 2	Grenchen	2–4	Young Boys	Grenchen
				Stadium: Stadion Brühl; Attendance: 3,000; Referee: (Switzerland) Eduard Iseli

25 September 1938 Round 3	Young Boys	1–1	FC Lausanne-Sport	Bern
				Stadium: Stadion Wankdorf; Attendance: 3,500; Referee: (Switzerland) Karl Wunderlin

2 October 1938 Round 4	FC La Chaux-de-Fonds	2–1	Young Boys	La Chaux-de-Fonds
				Stadium: Parc des Sports; Attendance: 3,000; Referee: (Switzerland) Walter Jordan

9 October 1938 Round 5	Young Boys	1–1	Grasshopper Club Zürich	Bern
				Stadium: Stadion Wankdorf; Attendance: 5,000; Referee: (Switzerland) Mario Grassi

26 October 1938 Round 6	Basel	0–0	Young Boys	Landhof, Basel
15:00		Summary		Attendance: 4,500; Referee: (Switzerland) Ferdinand Allemann Biel/Bienne

30 October 1938 Round 7	Young Boys	1–1	FC Biel-Bienne	Bern
				Stadium: Stadion Wankdorf; Attendance: 4,500; Referee: (Switzerland) Alfred Spengler

23 October 1938 Round 9	Young Boys	5–2	Luzern	Bern
				Stadium: Stadion Wankdorf; Attendance: 4,000; Referee: (Switzerland) Karl Wunderlin

13 November 1938 Round 8	Servette	2–1	Young Boys	Geneva
				Stadium: Charmilles Stadium; Attendance: 4,000; Referee: (Switzerland) Karl Wunderlin

27 November 1938 Round 10	Young Boys	0–0	FC Lugano	Bern
				Stadium: Stadion Wankdorf; Attendance: 6,000; Referee: (Switzerland) Walter Jordan

4 December 1938 Round 11	Young Fellows Zürich	2–0	Young Boys	Zürich
				Stadium: Letzigrund; Attendance: 3,500; Referee: (Switzerland) Eduard Iseli

11 December 1938 Round 12	FC Nordstern Basel	0–1	Young Boys	Basel
				Stadium: Stadion Rankhof; Attendance: 3,500; Referee: (Switzerland) Rodolphe Wittwer

18 December 1938 Round 13	Young Boys	2–2	FC Grenchen	Bern
				Stadium: Stadion Wankdorf; Attendance: 3,500; Referee: (Switzerland) Ferdinand Allemann

15 January 1939 Round 14	FC Lausanne-Sport	4–0	Young Boys	Lausanne
				Stadium: Stade olympique de la Pontaise; Attendance: 2,500; Referee: (Switzerland) Jean Lutz

22 January 1939 Round 15	Young Boys	1–1	FC La Chaux-de-Fonds	Bern
	Puigventos 34'		Fritz Wagner 87'	Stadium: Stadion Wankdorf; Attendance: 2,500; Referee: (Switzerland) Mario Grassi

26 February 1939 Round 16	Grasshopper Club Zürich	0–0	Young Boys	Zürich
				Stadium: Hardturm; Attendance: 2,000; Referee: (Switzerland) Walter Jordan

12 March 1939 Round 17	Young Boys	1–1	Basel	Wankdorf Stadium, Bern
	Halblinker (red card) 20'; Fish 82' (1:1)	Summary	80' (0:1) Ibach; (red card) 85' Schmidlin (I)	Attendance: 3,500; Referee: (Switzerland) Spengler Olten

26 March 1939 Round 19	Young Boys	1–3	Servette	Bern
				Stadium: Stadion Wankdorf; Attendance: 3,000; Referee: (Switzerland) Huber

16 April 1939 Round 20	Luzern	1–0	Young Boys	Lucerne
	Willy Karcher 40'			Stadium: Stadion Allmend; Attendance: 3,400; Referee: (Switzerland) Mario Grassi

23 April 1939 Round 21	Lugano	2–0	Young Boys	Lugano
	Lauro Amadò 3', 21'			Stadium: Campo Marzio; Attendance: 1,500; Referee: (Switzerland) Karl Wunderlin

30 April 1939 Round 22	Young Boys	0–3	Young Fellows Zürich	Bern
			Leopold Kielholz 47', 85'; Eugen Diebold 64'	Stadium: Stadion Wankdorf; Attendance: 2,000; Referee: (Switzerland) Rodolphe Wittwer

18 May 1939 Round 18	FC Biel-Bienne	0–1	Young Boys	Biel/Bienne
			Max Horisberger 28'	Stadium: Stadion Gurzelen; Attendance: 2,500; Referee: (Switzerland) Karl Wunderlin

=== Swiss Cup ===
29 January 1939 Round 1	Young Boys	4–2	Aarau	Bern
				Stadium: Stadion Wankdorf

5 February 1939 Round 2	FC La Chaux-de-Fonds	0–1	Young Boys	La Chaux-de-Fonds
				Stadium: Parc des Sports

19 February 1939 Round 3	Grasshopper Club Zürich	4–0	Young Boys	Zürich
				Stadium: Hardturm
