= 1939–40 Swiss Cup =

Tournament details
- Country: Switzerland

Final positions
- Champions: Grasshopper Club
- Runners-up: Grenchen

The 1939–40 Swiss Cup was the 15th season of Switzerland's football cup competition, organised annually since the 1925–26 season by the Swiss Football Association.

== Overview ==
=== Preamble ===
In Switzerland during the second world war period, sport became an integral part of the "spiritual national defense". This was a political and cultural movement that had already become increasingly important during the late 1930s. Politicians, intellectuals and media professionals had increasingly called for measures to strengthen Switzerland's basic cultural values. Since the Nationalliga games were also considered to be one of the activities that seemed important for maintaining the morale of the population, the military authorities put considerably fewer obstacles in the way of the top players and leading clubs as they had during the previous World War.

Nevertheless, the outbreak of the Second World War, triggered by the German attack on Poland on 1 September 1939, was also a shock for Switzerland, although international signs had been pointing towards a war for quite some time. On 30 August, the Federal Assembly in Switzerland elected staff officer Henri Guisan as Commander-in-Chief of the Army. On 2 September, general mobilisation for war took place. The national exhibition in Zurich, during which the national football team had also played representative matches against teams from neighbouring countries, was closed for some time. The general mobilisation brought regular championship operations to a standstill, and in its place an improvised mobilisation championship was held without automatic promotion or relegation. In some cases the games could not be played or were postponed because the clubs did not have enough players available and the same situation also found place in the cup competition.

=== Format ===
This season's cup competition began with a preliminary round, which was played, with one exception, on the week-end of 22 October 1939. The competition was to be completed on Easter Monday, 25 March 1940, with the final, which since a few years, was held in the country's capital, at the former Wankdorf Stadium in Bern. The preliminary round was held for the lower league teams that had not qualified themselves for the competition. The lower league teams that had qualified via their regional football association's own cup competitions, or had achieved their association's requirements, joined the competition in the first round. The clubs from this season's 1. Liga were given a bye for the first round and started in the second round. The clubs from the 1939–40 Nationalliga were given byes for the first three rounds. These teams joined the competition in the fourth round which was played on the first week-end in the New Year.

The matches were played in a knockout format. In the event of a draw after 90 minutes, the match went into extra time. In the event of a draw at the end of extra time, if agreed between the clubs, a replay was foreseen and this was played on the visiting team's pitch. Rules and regulations to this situation were altered and amended continuously by each regional football association, due to the current situation (second world war). If the replay ended in a draw after extra time, or if a replay had not been agreed, a toss of a coin would establish the team that qualified for the next round.

== Preliminary round ==
The lower league teams that had not qualified themselves for the competition via their regional football association's own regional cup competitions or had not achieved their association's requirements, competed here in a second chance round. Reserve teams were not admitted to the competition. The draw respected local regionalities. The preliminary was delayed from Mid-September due to the outbreak of the war, but was nevertheless played just a few weeks later, starting on 15 October and then continued on 22 October 1939.

=== Summary ===
Team 1	Score	Team 2
15 October 1939
Wettingen	4–0	Baden
22 October 1939
Gossau	2–4	Herisau
Arbon	2–4	FC Fortuna (SG)
FC Widnau	5–1	FC Rorschach
Winterthur	5–1	FC Phönix (Winterthur)
FC Adliswil	beat	FC Langnau am Albis (ZH)
FC Schlieren	0–2	AC Ticinese Zürich
Red Star	3–4	FC Wiedikon
Wohlen	7–0	FC Lenzburg
Schöftland	2–1	FC Unterentfelden
Sporting Club Aarau	2–1	FC Erlinsbach
Muttenz	4–3	Old Boys
Olimpia Basel	0–1	FC Liestal
Laufen	4–2	FC Allschwil
FC Madretsch (Biel)	2–3	FC Nidau
FC Langnau im Emmental (BE)	1–4	FC Ticino Bern
SC Trimbach-Olten	1–3	FC Olten
FC Langenthal	4–2	Burgdorf
FC Kestenholz	0–5	Fulgor Grenchen
Yverdon-Sport	5–0	FC Concordia Yverdon
FC Biberist	2–2 (a.e.t.)	FC Utzenstorf
SV Höngg (ZH)	3–3 (a.e.t.)	SC Hakoah (ZH)
SV Schaffhausen	0–12	FC Schaffhausen
FC Xamax (Neuchâtel)	FF; Awd 0–3	Colombier
FC Amical Saint-Prex	FF; Awd 0–3	FC Renens
FC Stade Payerne	FF; Awd 3–0	Central Fribourg
Chênois	FF; Awd 3–0	FC Cointrin (GE)
FC Compesières GE	FF; Awd 0–3	Amical Abattoir (GE)
Couvet-Sports	FF; Awd 3–0	FC Comète Peseux
FC Saint-Léonard	FF; Awd 0–3	FC Sierre
FC Oerlikon (ZH)	FF; Awd 3–0	FC Wetzikon
SC Weinfelden	FF; Awd 0–3	Kreuzlingen
FC Bözingen 34	FF; Awd 0–3	FC Grünstern (Ipsach)
Thun	FF; Awd 0–3	Minerva Bern
Vallorbe-Sports	n/p Both teams forfait	FC Orbe
Black Stars	n/p Both teams forfait	FC Breite Basel

Replay

Team 1	Score	Team 2
29 October 1939
FC Utzenstorf	3–0	FC Biberist
5 November 1939
SC Hakoah (ZH)	5–3	SV Höngg (ZH)

=== Matches ===
22 October 1939

Sporting Club Aarau	2–1	FC Erlinsbach
Goal	FCA summary	Goal

Stadion Brügglifeld, Aarau

== Round 1 ==
In the first round, the lower league teams that had already qualified themselves for the competition through their regional football association's own regional requirements competed here, together with the winners of the preliminary round. All the teams from this years 1. Liga were given a bye and they started in the next round. Whenever possible, the draw respected local regionalities. The first round took place on the first week-end in November, with a few exceptions.

=== Summary ===
Team 1	Score	Team 2
5 November 1939
FC Lachen	3–1	FC Adliswil
Kickers Luzern	6–1	Emmenbrücke
Polizei Zürich	0–2	FC Altstetten (Zürich)
SC Wipkingen	3–2	FC Diana Zürich
FC Oerlikon (ZH)	1–3	FC Wallisellen
Wohlen	3–1	FC Rupperswil
FC Buchs (AG)	5–4	Sporting Club Aarau
FC Turgi	3–8	Wettingen
FC Küsnacht (ZH)	1–3 Abd *	AC Ticinese Zürich
FC Industrie (ZH)	5–2	FC Wiedikon
Uster	5–2	SV Seebach
FC Muhen	4–2	FC Gränichen
Kreuzlingen	7–3	(a.e.t.) Frauenfeld
FC Fortuna (SG)	2–3	FC Widnau
Winterthur	4–3	FC Töss (Winterthur)
FC Schaffhausen	5–0	Paradies Feuerthalen
Herisau	5–2	FC Flawil
FC Oberwinterthur	2–5	FC Tössfeld (Winterthur)
SC Veltheim	2–3	FC Wülflingen
FC Thayngen	3–7	FC Neuhausen
Muttenz	7–0	SV Sissach
Zähringia Bern	1–2	FC Viktoria Bern
FC Helvetia Bern	1–0	Köniz
FC Ticino Bern	2–7	Minerva Bern
SC Zofingen	6–3	FC Langenthal
FC Tavannes	1–2	Moutier
FC Wynau	2–8	FC Olten
FC Reconvilier	0–3	FC Tramelan
FC Aigle	2–0	FC Chippis
FC La Neuveville	1–2	Colombier
FC Richemond (Fribourg)	1–4	FC Stade Payerne
Sylva-Sports (Le Locle)	3–1	FC Floria (La Chaux-de-Fonds)
Stade Lausanne	8–1	FC Gland
Racing Club Lausanne	3–1	ES Malley
FC Renens	7–1	FC Pully
FC Espérance Genève	0–3	CA Genève
Chênois	2–1	Amical Abattoirs (GE)
FC Pratteln	0–0 (a.e.t.)	FC Liestal
Stade Nyonnais	2–2 (a.e.t.)	CS La Tour-de-Peilz
19 November 1939
FC Nidau	3–5	FC Aurore Bienne
Ballspielclub Zürich	2–0	SC Hakoah (ZH)
US Pro Daro	FF; Awd 3–0	Melidese
FC Porrentruy	FF; Awd 3–0	Delémont
FC Schönenwerd	FF; Awd 0–3	Schöftland
FC Grünstern (Ipsach)	FF; Awd 3–0	SC Aegerten-Brügg
FC Gerlafingen	FF; Awd 3–0	FC Biberist
Fulgor Grenchen	FF; Awd 3–0	Wacker Grenchen
Saint-Imier-Sports	FF; Awd 3–0	FC Gloria (Le Locle)
Couvet-Sports	FF; Awd 0–3	FC Fleurier

- Note: The match Küsnacht–Ticinese was abandoned during play, Ticinese qualified for next round
- The teams from FC Sierre, FC Thalwil, SV Helvetik Basel, SC Derendingen, FC Yverdon and FC Laufen received byes.

Replays

Team 1	Score	Team 2
12 November 1939
FC Liestal	FF; Awd 3–0	FC Pratteln
CS La Tour-de-Peilz	FF; Awd 3–0	Stade Nyonnais

=== Matches ===
5 November 1939

FC Buchs (AG)	5–4	Sporting Club Aarau
Goal	summary	Goal

Sportanlage Wynenfeld

== Round 2 ==
The winning teams from the first round were joined by the 24 teams from this years reorganised 1. Liga to compete in the second round at the end of November.

=== Summary ===
Team 1	Score	Team 2
26 November 1939
Zürich	9–2	FC Tössfeld (Winterthur)
Uster	6–4 (a.e.t.)	SCI Juventus Zürich
Blue Stars	4–0	FC Wallisellen
FC Industrie (ZH)	3–3 (a.e.t.)	SC Zug
Bellinzona	3–3 (a.e.t.)	Kickers Luzern
Locarno	3–0	FC Thalwil
US Pro Daro	2–0	Chiasso
Herisau	3–8	Brühl
Aarau	2–0	FC Buchs (AG)
FC Schaffhausen	5–5 (a.e.t.)	Winterthur
FC Neuhausen	1–3	FC Wülflingen
FC Lachen	3–1	Chur
FC Altstetten (Zürich)	2–1	AC Ticinese Zürich
Ballspielclub Zürich	5–0	SC Wipkingen
Kreuzlingen	7–0	FC Widnau
Wohlen	0–3	Wettingen
FC Muhen	3–12	Schöftland
Moutier	1–5	Concordia
Muttenz	1–3	FC Birsfelden
SC Zofingen	1–6	Basel
FC Liestal	1–3	FC Olten
Laufen	3–4	Helvetik Basel
US Bienne-Boujean	0–2	FC Tramelan
SC Derendingen	0–5	Solothurn
FC Grünstern (Ipsach)	3–1	FC Yverdon
FC Aurore Bienne	1–0	FC Porrentruy
FC Viktoria Bern	1–8	Bern
FC Helvetia Bern	6–4	Minerva Bern
Fulgor Grenchen	0–4	FC Gerlafingen
Racing Club Lausanne	1–1 (a.e.t.)	FC Forward Morges
Vevey Sports	8–2	Stade Lausanne
CS La Tour-de-Peilz	5–3	FC Renens
FC Aigle	0–6	Monthey
Montreux-Sports	4–2	FC Sierre
USI Dopolavoro Genève	2–1	CA Genève
Urania Genève Sport	2–0	Chênois
Fribourg	12–0	FC Stade Payerne
Étoile-Sporting	3–0	Sylva-Sports (Le Locle)
FC Fleurier	2–4	Saint-Imier-Sports
10 December 1939
Cantonal Neuchâtel	12–2	Colombier

Replays

Team 1	Score	Team 2
10 December 1939
FC Forward Morges	4–4 (a.e.t.)	Racing Club Lausanne
17 December 1939
SC Zug	2–1	FC Industrie (ZH)
Kickers Luzern	FF; Awd 0–3	Bellinzona
Winterthur	0–3 (a.e.t.)	FC Schaffhausen

Second replay

Team 1	Score	Team 2
24 December 1939
Racing Club Lausanne	1–3	FC Forward Morges

=== Matches ===
26 November 1939
10:30

Zürich	9–2	FC Tössfeld (Winterthur)
Schneiter (1:0); Schneiter (2:0); Schneiter (3:0); Schneiter (4:0); Seiler (5:0); Seiler (6:0); Bosshard (7:0); Bosshard (8:0); Weiermann (9:1)	FCZ summary	(8:1) Iseli (9:0) Kutic

Letzigrund, Zürich
Attendance: 200
Referee: (Switzerland) Karl Massa (Uster)

26 November 1939

Aarau	2–0	FC Buchs (AG)
Goal	FCA summary

Stadion Brügglifeld, Aarau

26 November 1939

SC Zofingen	1–6	Basel
Goal	FCB summary	Goal

Zofingen
Attendance: 650

== Round 3 ==
=== Summary ===
Team 1	Score	Team 2
24 December 1939
FC Helvetia Bern	0–1	Bern
Saint-Imier-Sports	2–7	Cantonal Neuchâtel
FC Lachen	5–0	Locarno
Ballspielclub Zürich	2–4	SC Zug
Bellinzona	1–1 (a.e.t.)	US Pro Daro
Zürich	2–3	FC Altstetten (Zürich)
FC Schaffhausen	5–2	FC Wülflingen
Solothurn	0–1	FC Gerlafingen
Concordia	1–4	FC Olten
FC Aurore Bienne	3–2 (a.e.t.)	Monthey
Brühl	2–1	Kreuzlingen
Uster	2–0	Blue Stars
Schöftland	1–4	Basel
Wettingen	2–2 (a.e.t.)	Aarau
FC Birsfelden	5–2	Helvetik Basel
Urania Genève Sport	3–1	Vevey Sports
CS La Tour-de-Peilz	3–5	USI Dopolavoro Genève
Fribourg	7–1	FC Grünstern (Ipsach)
Étoile-Sporting	8–0	FC Tramelan
31 December 1939
FC Forward Morges	9–2	Montreux-Sports

Replays

Team 1	Score	Team 2
31 December 1939
US Pro Daro	1–2	Bellinzona
Aarau	4–1	Wettingen

=== Matches ===
24 December 1939

Zürich	2–3	FC Altstetten (Zürich)
Schneiter (1:0); Bosshard (2:1)	FCZ summary	(1:1) Giovio (2:2) Stutz (pen 2:3) Maurer

Letzigrund, Zürich
Attendance: 250
Referee: (Switzerland) Joseph Schürch (Winterthur)

24 December 1939

SC Schöftland	1–4	Basel
(pen. 1:3)	Summary	(0:1) (0:2) (0:3) (1:4)

Schöftland
Attendance: 600
Referee: (Switzerland) Emil Heiniger (Bern)

24 December 1939

Wettingen	2–2 (a.e.t.)	Aarau
Goal	FCA summary	Goal

Stadion Altenburg, Wettingen

31 December 1939
Replay

Aarau	4–1	Wettingen
Goal	FCA summary	Goal

Stadion Brügglifeld, Aarau

== Round 4 ==
The teams from this season's Nationalliga, who had received byes for the first three rounds, entered the cup competition in this round. The teams from the Nationalliga were seeded and could not be drawn against each other. Whenever possible, the draw respected local regionalities. The games of the fourth round were to be played the first Sunday of the New Year.

=== Summary ===
Team 1	Score	Team 2
7 January 1940
Biel-Bienne	0–1	Cantonal Neuchâtel
FC Lachen	6–2	SC Zug
Lugano	2–1	Bellinzona
FC Altstetten (Zürich)	0–2 (a.e.t.)	St. Gallen
FC Schaffhausen	0–9	Grasshopper Club
Young Boys	2–1	FC Aurore Bienne
Young Fellows	2–1	Brühl
Luzern	6–1	Uster
Basel	2–4	Aarau
FC Birsfelden	0–1	Nordstern
Urania Genève Sport	2–1	Servette
Lausanne-Sport	1–0	USI Dopolavoro Genève
La Chaux-de-Fonds	2–1	Étoile-Sporting
Grenchen	3–3 (a.e.t.)	Bern
FC Gerlafingen	1–1 (a.e.t.)	FC Olten
Fribourg	3–3 (a.e.t.)	FC Forward Morges

Replays

Team 1	Score	Team 2
21 January 1940
Bern	0–2	Grenchen
FC Olten	1–4	FC Gerlafingen
FC Forward Morges	1–0	Fribourg

=== Matches ===
7 January 1940

Biel-Bienne	1–0	Cantonal Neuchâtel
Sydler 75' (pen.)	RSSSF summary

Stadion Gurzelen, Biel/Bienne

7 January 1940
14:30

Basel	2–4	Aarau
Ibach (pen. 1:2) (o.g.)	FCB summary	(0:1) Wüest (0:2) Fischer (1:3) Beiner (1:4) Beiner

Landhof, Basel
Attendance: 1,000
Referee: (Switzerland) François Hofer (Moutier)

7 January 1940

Urania Genève Sport	2–1	Servette
Bertoletti 5' (1:0); Chevallier 49' (2:0)	Servette summary	60' (2:1) Walaschek

Stade de Frontenex, Genève

== Round 5 ==
=== Summary ===
Team 1	Score	Team 2
28 January 1940
Cantonal Neuchâtel	1–3	Grenchen
Urania Genève Sport	0–2	Lausanne-Sport
11 February 1940
FC Lachen	2–8	Lugano
St. Gallen	1–2	Grasshopper Club
FC Gerlafingen	1–5	Young Boys
Young Fellows	3–0	Luzern
FC Forward Morges	0–1	La Chaux-de-Fonds
Aarau	3–3 (a.e.t.)	Nordstern

Replay

Team 1	Score	Team 2
18 February 1940
Nordstern	3–2 (a.e.t.)	Aarau

=== Matches ===
11 February 1940

Aarau	3–3 (a.e.t.)	Nordstern
3x Wüest	FCA summary	2x Leutwiler

Stadion Brügglifeld, Aarau

18 February 1940
Replay

Nordstern	3–2 (a.e.t.)	Aarau
Forelli 5' (1:0); Bohrer; Gyger 118' (3:2)	FCA summary	(pen.) Schär; Destroff

Rankhof, Basel

== Quarter-finals ==
=== Summary ===
Team 1	Score	Team 2
25 February 1940
Lugano	0–2	Grasshopper Club
Young Boys	5–2	Young Fellows
Nordstern	1–3	Lausanne-Sport
Grenchen	5–4	La Chaux-de-Fonds

=== Matches ===
25 February 1940

Lugano	0–2	Grasshopper Club
	RSSSF summary	60' (0:1) Grubenmann; 65' (0:2) Grubenmann

Cornaredo Stadium, Lugano

25 February 1940

Young Boys	5–2	Young Fellows
Blaser 35' (1:1); Gobet 45' (1:2); Blaser 50' (1:3); Streun 75' (2:4); Streun 80' (2:5)	RSSSF summary	33' (0:1) Stuberus; 57' (2:3) Dériaz

25 February 1940

Nordstern	1–3	Lausanne-Sport
Bohrer 75' (1:3)	RSSSF summary	1' (0:1) Spagnoli; 19' (0:2) Burnet; 32' (0:3) Spagnoli

Rankhof, Basel

25 February 1940

Grenchen	5–4	La Chaux-de-Fonds
P. Aeby 10' (1:0); P. Aeby 13' (2:0); Buser 20' (3:1); Buser 25' (4:1); Buser 70' (pen 5:4)	RSSSF summary	17' (2:1) Zapella; 38' (pen 4:2) Wagner; 45' (4:3) Wagner; 55' (4:4) Wagner

Stadium Brühl, Grenchen

== Semi-finals ==
=== Summary ===
Team 1	Score	Team 2
10 March 1940
Grasshopper Club	2–0	Young Boys
Lausanne-Sport	0–3	Grenchen

=== Matches ===
10 March 1940

Grasshopper Club	2–0	Young Boys
Grubenmann 44' (1:0); Grubenmann 48' (2:0)	RSSSF summary

Hardturm, Zürich
Attendance: 5,000
Referee: (Switzerland) Walter Jordan (Basel)

10 March 1940

Lausanne-Sport	0–3	Grenchen
	RSSSF summary	25' (0:1) Buser; 66' (0:2) Ducommun; 73' (0:3) P. Aeby

Wankdorf Stadium, Bern
Attendance: 6,000
Referee: (Switzerland) Jean Lutz (Genève)

== Final ==
The final was traditionally held in the capital Bern, at the former Wankdorf Stadium, on Easter Monday 1940.

=== Summary ===
Team 1	Score	Team 2
25 March 1940
Grasshopper Club	3–0	Grenchen

=== Telegram ===
25 March 1940

Grasshopper Club	3–0	Grenchen
Grubenmann 8' (1:0); Thönen 70' (2:0); Grubenmann 83' (3:0)	Fussball-Schweiz summary

Wankdorf Stadium, Bern
Attendance: 16,000
Referee: (Switzerland) Hans Wüthrich, (Bern)

Grasshopper Club won the cup and this was the club's seventh cup title to this date.

== Further in Swiss football ==
- 1939–40 Nationalliga
- 1939–40 Swiss 1. Liga
- 1939–40 FC Basel season
- 1939–40 BSC Young Boys season

== Sources ==
- Fussball-Schweiz
- FCB Cup games 1939–40 at fcb-achiv.ch
- Switzerland 1939–40 at RSSSF

Preceded by 1938–39	Swiss Cup seasons	Succeeded by 1940–41
