= 1939–40 BSC Young Boys season =

BSC Young Boys
1939–40 season
- Chairman: Eduard Studer
- Manager: Hans Pulver
- Stadium: Stadion Wankdorf
- Nationalliga: 5th
- Swiss Cup: Semi-finals

The 1939–40 season was the 41st season in the history of Berner Sport Club Young Boys. The team played their home games at Stadion Wankdorf in Bern and placed 5th in the Nationalliga, and was then eliminated in the semi-finals of the Swiss Cup.

== Players ==
- Maurice Glur
- Achille Siegrist
- Louis Gobet
- Otto Hänni
- Hans Liniger
- Cuany
- Fritz Knecht
- Hans Blaser
- Willy Terretaz
- Zulliger
- Olivier Eggimann

== Competitions ==
=== Overall record ===
Competition	First match	Last match	Starting round	Final position	Record							
Competition	First match	Last match	Starting round	Final position	Pld	W	D	L	GF	GA	GD	Win %
Nationalliga	22 October 1939	14 July 1940	Matchday 1	5th	22	11	3	8	37	27	+10	50.00
Swiss Cup	7 January 1940	10 March 1940	Round 1	Semi-finals	4	3	0	1	12	6	+6	75.00
Total					26	14	3	9	49	33	+16	53.85

Source: Competitions

=== Nationalliga ===
==== League table ====
Pos	Team	Pld	W	D	L	GF	GA	GD	Pts	Qualification or relegation
3	Grasshopper Club	22	10	6	6	45	30	+15	26	Swiss Cup winners
4	Lausanne-Sport	22	10	5	7	40	26	+14	25	
5	Young Boys	22	11	3	8	37	27	+10	25	
6	Lugano	22	12	1	9	46	38	+8	25	
7	La Chaux-de-Fonds	22	10	2	10	41	35	+6	22	

Source: rsssf.com
Rules for classification: 1) Points; 2) Goal difference within the league, however with play-off for qualifiers;

==== Matches ====
22 October 1939 1	Servette	6–3	Young Boys	Geneva
				Stadium: Charmilles Stadium; Attendance: 2,500; Referee: Felix Herren

19 November 1939 2	FC Lausanne-Sport	1–0	Young Boys	Lausanne
				Stadium: Stade olympique de la Pontaise; Attendance: 800; Referee: Rodolphe Wittwer

26 November 1939 3	Young Boys	3–0	FC Biel-Bienne	Bern
				Stadium: Stadion Wankdorf; Attendance: 1,200; Referee: Karl Wunderlin

3 December 1939 4	FC La Chaux-de-Fonds	2–0	Young Boys	La Chaux-de-Fonds
				Stadium: Parc des Sports; Attendance: 1,500; Referee: Jean Lutz

10 December 1939 5	Young Boys	0–1	FC Grenchen	Bern
				Stadium: Stadion Wankdorf; Attendance: 1,800; Referee: Felix Herren

14 January 1940 6	Young Boys	1–4	Servette	Bern
				Stadium: Stadion Wankdorf; Attendance: 2,000; Referee: Felix Herren

21 January 1940 7	Young Boys	2–1	FC Lausanne-Sport	Bern
				Stadium: Stadion Wankdorf; Attendance: 800; Referee: Ferdinand Allemann

18 February 1940 9	Young Boys	3–1	FC La Chaux-de-Fonds	Bern
				Stadium: Stadion Wankdorf; Attendance: 1,000; Referee: Ferdinand Allemann

3 March 1940 8	FC Biel-Bienne	0–0	Young Boys	Biel/Bienne
				Stadium: Stadion Gurzelen; Attendance: 1,000; Referee: Felix Herren

17 March 1940 10	FC Grenchen	1–1	Young Boys	Grenchen
				Stadium: Stadion Brühl; Attendance: 2,000; Referee: Rodolphe Wittwer

24 March 1940 18	Lugano	4–1	Young Boys	Lucerne
				Stadium: Campo Marzio; Attendance: 1,500; Referee: Ernst Jaggi

7 April 1940 11	Grasshopper Club Zürich	2–0	Young Boys	Zürich
				Stadium: Hardturm; Attendance: 3,000; Referee: Felix Herren

14 April 1940 12	Young Boys	4–1	Lugano	Bern
				Stadium: Stadion Wankdorf; Attendance: 2,500; Referee: Jean Lutz

28 April 1940 13	Young Boys	3–0	Luzern	Bern
				Stadium: Stadion Wankdorf; Attendance: 2,000; Referee: Jean Lutz

5 May 1940 14	St. Gallen	0–2	Young Boys	St. Gallen
				Stadium: Espenmoos; Attendance: 1,000; Referee: Eugen Scherz

9 June 1940 15	Young Boys	0–0	Young Fellows Zürich	Bern
				Stadium: Stadion Wankdorf; Attendance: 500; Referee: Rodolphe Wittwer

16 June 1940 16	FC Nordstern Basel	0–1	Young Boys	Basel
				Stadium: Stadion Rankhof; Attendance: 800; Referee: Felix Herren

22 June 1940 17	Young Boys	2–0	Grasshopper Club Zürich	Bern
				Stadium: Stadion Wankdorf; Attendance: 1,500; Referee: Jean Lutz

6 July 1940 19	Luzern	3–0	Young Boys	Lucerne
				Stadium: Stadion Allmend; Attendance: 1,000; Referee: Studer

7 July 1940 22	Young Boys	4–0	FC Nordstern Basel	Bern
				Stadium: Stadion Wankdorf; Attendance: 1,000; Referee: Ernst Jaggi

13 July 1940 21	Young Fellows Zürich	0–1	Young Boys	Zürich
				Stadium: Stadion Letzigrund; Attendance: 800; Referee: Rafaele Pusterla

14 July 1940 20	Young Boys	6–0	St. Gallen	Bern
				Stadium: Stadion Wankdorf; Attendance: 1,000; Referee: Adrien Sandoz

=== Swiss Cup ===
7 January 1940 Round 4	Young Boys	2–1	Aurore Bienne	Bern
				Stadium: Stadion Wankdorf

11 February 1940 Round of 16	FC Gerlafingen	1–5	Young Boys	Gerlafingen

25 February 1940 Quarter-finals	Young Boys	5–2	Young Fellows Zürich	Bern
				Stadium: Stadion Wankdorf

10 March 1940 Semi-finals	Grasshopper Club Zürich	2–0	Young Boys	Zürich
				Stadium: Hardturm
