= 1938–39 Swiss 1. Liga =

1. Liga
- Season: 1938–39
- Champions: 1. Liga champions: St. Gallen; Group West winners: Cantonal Neuchâtel; Group East winners: St. Gallen
- Promoted: St. Gallen
- Relegated: Concordia Yverdon; Winterthur; Kreuzlingen
- Matches: 2x 132; 1 decider plus 2 play-offs and 2 play-outs

The 1938–39 1. Liga season was the 7th season of the 1. Liga since its creation in 1931. At this time, the 1. Liga was the second-tier of the Swiss football league system.

== Overview ==
There were 24 clubs that competed in the 1. Liga this season. They were divided into two regional groups, each with 12 teams. The teams in each group played a double round-robin to decide their league position. Two points were awarded for a win and one point was awarded for a draw. Both group winners then contested a play-off round to decide the championship and promotion to the top-tier Nationalliga. The last placed team in each group were directly relegated to the 2. Liga (third tier) and the two second last teams played a play-out against the third and last relegation slot.

== Group West ==
=== Teams, locations ===
Club	Based in	Canton	Stadium	Capacity
FC Aarau	Aarau	Aargau	Stadion Brügglifeld	9,240
FC Bern	Bern	Bern	Stadion Neufeld	14,000
FC Cantonal Neuchâtel	Neuchâtel	Neuchâtel	Stade de la Maladière	25,500
FC Concordia Yverdon	Yverdon-les-Bains	Vaud	Stade Municipal	6,600
Dopolavoro Genève	Genève	Geneva		
FC Fribourg	Fribourg	Fribourg	Stade Universitaire	9,000
FC Monthey	Monthey	Valais	Stade Philippe Pottier	1,800
FC Montreux-Sports	Montreux	Vaud	Stade de Chailly	1,000
FC Forward Morges	Morges	Vaud	Parc des Sports	600
FC Solothurn	Solothurn	Solothurn	Stadion FC Solothurn	6,750
Urania Genève Sport	Genève	Geneva	Stade de Frontenex	4,000
Vevey Sports	Vevey	Vaud	Stade de Copet	4,000

=== Final league table ===
Pos	Team	Pld	W	D	L	GF	GA	GD	Pts	Qualification or relegation
1	FC Cantonal Neuchâtel	22	16	2	4	70	26	+44	34	To promotion play-off
2	Urania Genève Sport	22	14	1	7	46	36	+10	29	
3	FC Fribourg	22	8	8	6	43	34	+9	24	
4	FC Solothurn	22	8	8	6	45	36	+9	24	
5	Dopolavoro Genève	22	9	5	8	28	41	−13	23	
6	FC Forward Morges	22	8	6	8	33	30	+3	22	
7	FC Monthey	22	8	4	10	43	49	−6	20	
8	FC Bern	22	7	5	10	35	41	−6	19	
9	FC Montreux-Sports	22	6	7	9	31	49	−18	19	
10	FC Aarau	22	8	2	12	41	43	−2	18	Decider tenth/eleventh position
11	Vevey Sports	22	7	4	11	36	45	−9	18	Decider tenth/eleventh position
12	FC Concordia Yverdon	22	4	6	12	28	49	−21	14	Relegation to 2. Liga

Source: RSSSF
Rules for classification: 1) Points; 2) Goal difference within the league, but decider play-off for qualifiers.

=== Decider for tenth place ===
Because Aarau and Vevey Sports finished level on points. A decider for tenth and eleventh place was required, because eleventh place was the relegation play-out slot. The decider was played on 4 June at Stade Universitaire in Fribourg.

Team 1	Score	Team 2
Aarau	2–1	Vevey Sports

Aarau won and remained in the division in for the next season. Vevey Sports had to contest the play-out against relegation with the eleventh placed team of the other group.

== Group East ==
=== Teams, locations ===
Club	Based in	Canton	Stadium	Capacity
AC Bellinzona	Bellinzona	Ticino	Stadio Comunale Bellinzona	5,000
FC Birsfelden	Birsfelden	Basel-Landschaft	Sternenfeld	9,400
FC Blue Stars Zürich	Zürich	Zürich	Hardhof	1,000
SC Brühl	St. Gallen	St. Gallen	Paul-Grüninger-Stadion	4,200
FC Chiasso	Chiasso	Ticino	Stadio Comunale Riva IV	4,000
FC Concordia Basel	Basel	Basel-Stadt	Stadion Rankhof	7,000
SC Juventus Zürich	Zürich	Zürich	Utogrund	2,850
FC Kreuzlingen	Kreuzlingen	Thurgau	Sportplatz Hafenareal	1,200
FC Locarno	Locarno	Ticino	Stadio comunale Lido	5,000
FC St. Gallen	St. Gallen	St. Gallen	Espenmoos	11,000
FC Zürich	Zürich	Zürich	Letzigrund	25,000

=== Final league table ===
Pos	Team	Pld	W	D	L	GF	GA	GD	Pts	Qualification or relegation
1	FC St. Gallen	22	13	4	5	59	26	+33	30	To promotion play-off
2	FC Concordia Basel	22	10	7	5	40	39	+1	27	
3	AC Bellinzona	22	10	6	6	40	31	+9	26	
4	SC Brühl	22	10	4	8	44	33	+11	24	
5	FC Zürich	22	10	4	8	45	43	+2	24	
6	FC Locarno	22	10	3	9	36	27	+9	23	
7	FC Birsfelden	22	8	6	8	33	33	0	22	
8	FC Blue Stars Zürich	22	7	6	9	26	29	−3	20	
9	FC Chiasso	22	7	6	9	27	38	−11	20	
10	SC Juventus Zürich	22	7	5	10	34	45	−11	19	
11	FC Kreuzlingen	22	5	6	11	30	44	−14	16	Play-out against relegation
12	FC Winterthur	22	5	3	14	16	42	−26	13	Relegation to 2. Liga

Source: RSSSF
Rules for classification: 1) Points; 2) Goal difference within the league, but decider play-off for qualifiers.

== Promotion, relegation ==
The two group winners played a two legged tie for the title of 1. Liga champions and for promotion to the 1939–40 Nationalliga. The games were played on 4 and 11 June 1939.

=== Championship play-off ===
Team 1	Score	Team 2
St. Gallen	3–0	Cantonal Neuchâtel
Cantonal Neuchâtel	1–1	St. Gallen

St. Gallen won the 1. Liga championship title and were promoted to 1939–40 Nationalliga. Cantonal Neuchâtel remained in the division for the next season.

=== Relegation play-out ===
The two second last placed teams from each group played a single legged tie to decide the third and last relegation slot. The game was played on 18 June in Vevey.

Team 1	Score	Team 2
Vevey Sports	6–1	Kreuzlingen

Vevey Sports won and remained in the division. Kreuzlingen were relegated to the 2. Liga.

== Further in Swiss football ==
- 1938–39 Nationalliga
- 1938–39 Swiss Cup

== Sources ==
- Switzerland 1938–39 at RSSSF

Preceded by 1937–38	Seasons in Swiss 1. Liga	Succeeded by 1939–40
