= 1938–39 Swiss Cup =

Tournament details
- Country: Switzerland

Final positions
- Champions: Lausanne-Sport
- Runners-up: Nordstern

The 1938–39 Swiss Cup was the 14th edition of Switzerland's football cup competition, organised annually since the 1925–26 season by the Swiss Football Association.

== Overview ==
This season's cup competition began with a preliminary round which was played during the last two week-ends of August 1938. The first round was played at the beginning of September, in advance of the league season. The competition was to be completed on Easter Monday, 10 April 1939, with the final, which since a few years, was held in the country's capital in Bern, at the former Wankdorf Stadium.

The preliminary round was held for the lower league teams that had not qualified themselves for the competition. These were 20 teams from the 2. Liga (third tier). The lower league teams that had qualified via their regional football association's own cup competitions, or had achieved their association's requirements, joined the competition in the first round. The clubs from this season's 1. Liga were given a bye for the first round and started in the second round. The clubs from the 1938–39 Nationalliga were given byes for the first three rounds. These teams joined the competition in the fourth round which was played, with one exception on the second Sunday of the New Year.

The matches were played in a knockout format. In the event of a draw after 90 minutes, the match went into extra time. In the event of a draw at the end of extra time, if agreed between the clubs, a replay was foreseen and this was played on the visiting team's pitch. If the replay ended in a draw after extra time, or if a replay had not been agreed, a toss of a coin would establish the team that qualified for the next round.

== Preliminary round ==
The lower league teams that had not qualified themselves for the competition via their regional football association's own regional cup competitions or had not achieved their assocciation's requirements, competed here in a second chance round. Reserve teams were not admitted to the competition. The draw respected local regionalities. The preliminary round was played at the end of August in advance of the league season.

=== Summary ===
Team 1	Score	Team 2
21 August 1938
FC Schaffhausen	5–0	SV Schaffhausen
28 August 1938
GC Luganesi	0–7	SC Balerna
FC Altstetten (Zürich)	1–0	FC Wallisellen
FC Lachen	7–2	FC Diana Zürich
FC Turgi	2–0 (a.e.t.)	Sporting Club Aarau
Moutier	5–2	Delémont
Richemond Fribourg	1–0	FC Stade Payerne
Étoile-Sporting	8–1	FC Saint-Imier
ES Malley	2–0	Rapid Lausanne
FC La Neuveville	6–2	FC Béroche Saint-Aubin

=== Matches ===
28 August 1938

FC Turgi	2–0 (a.e.t.)	Sporting Club Aarau
Goal	FCA summary

Stadion Brügglifeld, Aarau
- Both teams played the 1938/39 season in the 2. Liga (third tier).

== Round 1 ==
In the first round, the lower league teams that had already qualified themselves for the competition through their regional football association's own regional requirements competed here, together with the winners of the preliminary round. All the teams from this years 1. Liga were given a bye for this round and so they started the competition in the second round. Whenever possible, the draw respected local regionalities. The first round took place on the first and second week-ends in September.

=== Summary ===
Team 1	Score	Team 2
4 September 1938
Old Boys	1–3	FC Allschwil
FC Porrentruy	3–1	Moutier
Black Stars	5–1	SV Sissach
FC Liestal	2–1	Laufen
Muttenz	4–1	SC Kleinhüningen
FC Breite (Basel)	1–3	Olympia Basel
FC Olten	13–0	FC Langenthal
SC Trimbach-Olten	6–3	Zofingen
Zähringia Bern	1–2	Thun
FC Helvetia Bern	5–2	Minerva Bern
SC Derendingen	6–0	FC Biberist
US Bienne-Boujean	5–1	Fulgor Grenchen
SC Aegerten-Brügg	0–6	FC Nidau
FC Grünstern (Ipsach)	1–8	FC Aurore Bienne
FC Gerlafingen	1–3	FC Luterbach
Frauenfeld	2–5	FC Töss (Winterthur)
11 September 1938
SC Zug	2–1	Kickers Luzern
Uster	2–4	SV Seebach
Baden	3–1	FC Gränichen
SC Wipkingen	2–0	FC Küsnacht (ZH)
Schöftland	3–3 (a.e.t.)	Wohlen
FC Wiedikon	0–2	SV Höngg
FC Wetzikon	0–3	Red Star
FC Thalwil	0–2	FC Wädenswil
FC Horgen	3–0	FC Langnau am Albis (ZH)
FC Turgi	6–4	FC Buchs
FC Unterentfelden	1–0	FC Erlinsbach
FC Schönenwerd	4–1	FC Lenzburg
FC Südstern Luzern	3–4	FC Zug
FC Altstetten (Zürich)	4–2	FC Oerlikon (ZH)
FC Industrie	0–2	FC Lachen
FC Tössfeld (Winterthur)	6–1	FC Oberwinterthur
Gossau	1–2	FC Fortuna (SG)
Arbon	6–0	SC Weinfelden
FC Ems	0–0 (a.e.t.)	Chur
FC Phönix (Winterthur)	1–3	FC Wülflingen
FC Flawil	2–4	FC Rorschach
FC Schaffhausen	5–0	FC Neuhausen
Comète Peseux	1–5	Xamax-Sports (Neuchâtel)
Martigny-Sports	0–3	Sion
FC Tavannes	5–2	FC Gloria Le Locle-Sports
FC Sierre	2–1	FC Chippis
CA Genève	3–6	Amical Abattoir (GE)
FC Chailly	1–5	Stade Nyonnais
FC Cointrin	0–1	FC Compesières (GE)
Vallorbe-Sports	1–0	FC La Neuveville
Richemond Fribourg	2–0	FC Yverdon
FC Tramelan	2–1 (a.e.t.)	Étoile-Sporting
CS La Tour-de-Peilz	4–3 (a.e.t.)	ES Malley
AS Melide	1–0	SC Balerna
FC Orbe	4–4 (a.e.t.)	Central Fribourg
FC Fleurier	3–3 (a.e.t.)	Couvet-Sports
18 September 1938
Espérance Genève	4–1	Acacias-Sports
FC Renens	4–2	Racing Club Lausanne
2 October 1938
FC Adliswil	5–4	Wettingen
FC Lerchenfeld (Thun)	1–4	FC Viktoria Bern

Replays

Team 1	Score	Team 2
2 October 1938
Wohlen	2–1	Schöftland
Chur	0–1	FC Ems
Central Fribourg	3–0	FC Orbe
Couvet-Sports	2–1	FC Fleurier

== Round 2 ==
The winning teams from the first round were joined by the 24 teams from this years reorganised 1. Liga to compete in the second round, that was played, with one exception, at the beginning of November.

=== Summary ===
Team 1	Score	Team 2
2 October 1938
USI Dopolavoro Genève	0–2	Espérance Genève
6 November 1938
Locarno	2–1	AS Melide
Winterthur	9–0	FC Horgen
FC Zug	4–0	Chiasso
Wohlen	0–3	Aarau
FC Wädenswil	2–0	Juventus Zürich
FC Ems	1–3	Blue Stars
Kreuzlingen	7–1	FC Töss (Winterthur)
Baden	1–1 (a.e.t.)	SC Zug
Bern	1–2	FC Viktoria Bern
FC Fortuna (SG)	0–1	Arbon
Black Stars	2–2 (a.e.t.)	FC Porrentruy
FC Liestal	1–1 (a.e.t.)	FC Allschwil
SC Derendingen	1–2	FC Olten
Zürich	1–0	SC Wipkingen
Brühl	3–0	FC Tössfeld (Winterthur)
FC Altstetten (Zürich)	0–1	FC Lachen
SV Seebach (ZH)	1–2	SV Höngg
Red Star	1–5	FC Adliswil
FC Schaffhausen	4–1	FC Wülflingen
FC Schönenwerd	0–2	Bellinzona
Olympia Basel	2–4	FC Birsfelden
FC Luterbach	1–0	FC Aurore Bienne
FC Rorschach	3–7	St. Gallen
FC Nidau	1–5	Cantonal Neuchâtel
Solothurn	1–2	US Bienne-Boujean
Concordia Basel	2–4 (a.e.t.)	Muttenz
Fribourg	7–0	SC Trimbach-Olten
Urania Genève Sport	6–1	Stade Nyonnais
FC Tramelan	2–3	Concordia Yverdon
Thun	3–2	Minerva Bern
FC Tavannes	4–0	Richemond Fribourg
13 November 1938
FC Unterentfelden	2–4 (a.e.t.)	FC Turgi
FC Xamax (Neuchâtel)	2–0	Vallorbe-Sports
20 November 1938
Monthey	6–2	Sion
Montreux-Sports	6–1	Couvet-Sports
FC Compesières	1–3	CS La Tour-de-Peilz
Vevey Sports	5–0	Central Fribourg
FC Forward Morges	3–0	Amical Abattoir (GE)
FC Renens	2–3 (a.e.t.)	FC Sierre

Replays

Team 1	Score	Team 2
13 November 1938
SC Zug	4–0	Baden
FC Porrentruy	FF * Awd 0–3	Black Stars
FC Allschwil	1–2	FC Liestal

- Note: FC Porrentruy declaired forfeit, the game was awarded 0–3, so Black Stars qualified for the next round.

=== Matches ===
6 November 1938

Wohlen	0–3	Aarau
	FCA summary	Goal

Stadion Niedermatten, Wohlen
- FC Wohlen played the 1938/39 season in the 2. Liga (third tier), Aarau in the 1. Liga (second tier).

6 November 1938
15:00

Zürich	1–0	SC Wipkingen
Weiermann 85' (1:0)	FCZ summary

Letzigrund, Zürich
- SC Wipkingen played the 1938/39 season in the 2. Liga (third tier), Zürich in the 1. Liga (second tier).

== Round 3 ==
=== Summary ===
Team 1	Score	Team 2
20 November 1938
SC Zug	4–2	Locarno
FC Schaffhausen	3–5	Brühl
Aarau	6–0	FC Olten
FC Turgi	2–7	Fribourg
FC Xamax (Neuchâtel)	3–1	Concordia Yverdon
US Bienne-Boujean	1–2	FC Tavannes
Cantonal Neuchâtel	2–0	FC Luterbach
Winterthur	2–0	SV Höngg
Kreuzlingen	3–2	FC Adliswil
FC Liestal	0–6	FC Birsfelden
FC Lachen	0–2	Blue Stars
FC Wädenswil	1–3	Zürich
Black Stars	1–4	Concordia Basel
Arbon	0–2	St. Gallen
11 December 1938
Montreux-Sports	4–1	FC Viktoria Bern
FC Forward Morges	8–1	FC Sierre
Monthey	0–0 (a.e.t.)	Espérance Genève (t)
18 December 1938
Vevey Sports	4–3 (a.e.t.)	Thun
Bellinzona	5–1	FC Zug
CS La Tour-de-Peilz	2–2 (a.e.t.)	Urania Genève Sport

- Note (t): Match Monthey–Espérance no replay was agreed between the two teams. Espérance qualified on toss of a coin.

Replay

Team 1	Score	Team 2
1 January 1939
Urania Genève Sport	6–2	CS La Tour-de-Peilz

=== Matches ===
20 November 1938

Aarau	6–0	FC Olten
Goal	FCA summary

Stadion Brügglifeld, Aarau
- FC Olten played the 1938/39 season in the 2. Liga (third tier).

20 November 1938

FC Wädenswil	1–3	Zürich
Büsser 4' (1:0)	FCZ summary	55' (1:1) Walter; 60' (1:2) Bosshard; 80' (pen 1:3) Bosshard

Sportplatz Schönegg, Wädenswil
Attendance: 600
Referee: (Switzerland) Saly Rosenbaum (Zürich)
- FC Wädenswil played the 1938/39 season in the 3. Liga (fourth tier).

== Round 4 ==
The teams from this season's Nationalliga, who had received byes for the first three rounds, entered the cup competition in this round. The teams from the Nationalliga were seeded and could not be drawn against each other. Whenever possible, the draw respected local regionalities. The first game of the fourth round was played in December, but the rest were played after the New Year.

=== Summary ===
Team 1	Score	Team 2
11 December 1938
St. Gallen	1–3	Brühl
8 January 1939
FC Forward Morges	0–6	Servette
La Chaux-de-Fonds	2–1 *	Urania Genève Sport
Montreux-Sports	2–2 (a.e.t.) *	Vevey Sports
Espérance Genève	0–4 *	Lausanne-Sport
Grenchen	4–1	FC Tavannes
Cantonal Neuchâtel	0–0 (a.e.t.)	Biel-Bienne
Bellinzona	0–4	Grasshopper Club
Winterthur	0–3	Luzern
Kreuzlingen	1–2 *	Young Fellows
FC Birsfelden	2–2 (a.e.t.)	Blue Stars
Zürich	1–2 *	Lugano
Concordia Basel	2–3	Basel
22 January 1939
Fribourg	4–0	FC Xamax (Neuchâtel)
29 January 1939
Young Boys	4–2	Aarau
SC Zug	1–7	Nordstern

- Note: The match La Chaux-de-Fonds–Urania was played in Genève.
- Note: The match Montreux–Vevey was abandoned after 90 minutes, extra-time was not played due to bad pitch and replayed.
- Note: The match Espérance–Lausanne-Sport was played in Lausanne.
- Note: The match Kreuzlingen–Young Fellows was played in Zürich.
- Note: The match Zürich–Lugano was played in Lugano.

Replays

Team 1	Score	Team 2
22 January 1939
Blue Stars	2–0	FC Birsfelden
29 January 1938
Vevey Sports	7–1	Montreux-Sports
Biel-Bienne	5–2	Cantonal Neuchâtel

=== Matches ===
8 January 1939

FC Forward Morges	0–6	Servette
	Servette summary	27' (0:1) Burnet; 32' (0:2) Belli; 47' (0:3) Lukács; 75' (0:4) Lukács; 75' (0:5) Aeby; 85' (0:6) Lukács

Parc des Sports, Morges
- Forward Morges played the 1938/39 season in the 1. Liga (second tier), Servette in the Nationaliga (top-tier).

8 January 1939

Zürich	1–2	Lugano
Weiermann 53' (1:1)	FCZ summary	9' (0:1) Andreoli; 60' (1:2) Italo Zali

Campo Marzio, Lugano
Attendance: 1,200
Referee: (Switzerland) Gildo Raimondi (Chiasso)
- Zürich played the 1938/39 season in the 1. Liga (second tier), Lugano in the Nationaliga (top-tier).

8 January 1939
14:30

Concordia Basel	3–2	Basel
Martignoli 12' (0:1); Rufer 76' (3:2)	FCB summary	30' (1:1) Sattler; 48' (2:1) Ibach; 60' (3:1) Ibach

Landhof, Basel
Attendance: 3,500
Referee: (Switzerland) Hans Wüthrich Bern
- Concordia played the 1938/39 season in the 1. Liga (second tier), Basel in the Nationaliga (top-tier). Concordia waivered home-advantage and the game was played in FC Basel's home stadium.

29 January 1939

Young Boys	4–2	Aarau
Poretti 30' (pen.); Puigventos 47' (2:0); Hänni 55' (3:0); Horisberger 58' (4:0)	FCA summary	65' (4:1) Wüest; 75' (4:2) Schär

Wankdorf Stadium, Bern
- Young Boys played the 1938/39 season in the Nationaliga (top-tier). Aarau in the 1. Liga (second tier)

== Round 5 ==
=== Summery ===
Team 1	Score	Team 2
29 January 1939
Servette	4–1	Fribourg
Young Fellows	0–1	Lugano
Basel	1–3	Brühl
Blue Stars	0–5	Grasshopper Club
5 February 1939
Lausanne-Sport	2–0	Grenchen
La Chaux-de-Fonds	0–1	Young Boys
Vevey Sports	2–1	Biel-Bienne
Luzern	2–2 (a.e.t.)	Nordstern

Replay

Team 1	Score	Team 2
12 February 1939
Nordstern	2–1	Luzern

=== Matches ===
29 January 1939

Servette	4–1	Fribourg
Lukács 40'; Aeby 42'; Belli 70'; Burnet 71'	Servette summary	Balestra

Stade des Charmilles, Geneva
- Fribourg played the 1938/39 season in the 1. Liga (second tier).

29 January 1939
14:30

Basel	1–3	SC Brühl St. Gallen
Schmidlin (I) (1:1)	FCB summary	(0:1) Spengler (1:2) Joris; 26' (1:3) Spengler

Landhof, Basel
Attendance: 2,500
Referee: (Switzerland) Mario Grassi (Balerna)
- Brühl played the 1938/39 season in the 1. Liga (second tier).

== Quarter-finals ==
=== Summary ===
Team 1	Score	Team 2
19 February 1939
Grasshopper Club	4–0	Young Boys
Servette	1–2	Lausanne-Sport
Nordstern	3–2	Lugano
Brühl	3–2	Vevey Sports

=== Matches ===
19 February 1939

Grasshopper Club	4–0	Young Boys
Krismer (1:0); Krismer (2:0); Winkler (3:0); Winkler (4:0)	RSSSF summary

Hardturm, Zürich

19 February 1939

Servette	1–2	Lausanne-Sport
Lukács 29' (1:1)	Servette summary	20' (0:1) Ter-Oganessian; 37' (1:2) Spagnoli

Stade des Charmilles, Geneva

19 February 1939

Nordstern	3–2	Lugano
Büche 48' (1:1); Kaltenbrunner 50' (2:1); Parera 68' (3:1)	RSSSF summary	26' (0:1) Morganti; 70' (3:2) Amadò

Landhof, Basel

19 February 1939

Brühl	3–2	Vevey Sports
Joris; Spengler; Tanner	RSSSF summary	Grosz; Hasler

Paul-Grüninger-Stadion, St. Gallen
- Both teams played the 1938/39 season in the 1. Liga (second tier).

== Semi-finals ==
=== Summary ===
Team 1	Score	Team 2
5 March 1939
Nordstern	3–0	Brühl
Lausanne-Sport	1–1 (a.e.t.)	Grasshopper Club

Team 1	Score	Team 2
7 April 1939
Lausanne-Sport	2–0	Grasshopper Club

=== Matches ===
5 March 1939

Nordstern	3–0	Brühl
Forelli 23' (1:0); Losa 47' (2:0); Losa 57' (3:0)	RSSSF summary

Letzigrund, Zürich
Attendance: 1,500
Referee: (Switzerland) William Bangerter (La Chaux-de-Fonds)

5 March 1939

Lausanne-Sport	1–1 (a.e.t.)	Grasshopper Club
Spagnoli 68' (1:1)	RSSSF summary	65' (1:0) Max Abegglen

Stadion Neufeld, Bern
Attendance: 4,000
Referee: (Switzerland) Eugen Scherz (Bern)

7 April 1939

Lausanne-Sport	2–0	Grasshopper Club
Rauch 20' (o.g.); Spagnoli 61' (2:0)	RSSSF summary

Pontaise, Lausanne
Attendance: 10,000
Referee: (Switzerland) Karl Wunderlin (Basel)

== Final ==
The final was traditionally held in the capital Bern, at the former Wankdorf Stadium, on Easter Monday 1938.

=== Summary ===
Team 1	Score	Team 2
10 April 1939
Lausanne-Sport	2–0	Nordstern

=== Telegram ===
10 April 1939
15:00

Lausanne-Sport	2–0	Nordstern
Bichsel 24' (pen.); Spagnoli 43' (2:0)	Fussball-Schweiz summary

Wankdorf Stadium, Bern
Attendance: 14,000
Referee: (Switzerland) Eugen Scherz (Bern)

Lausanne-Sport won the cup and this was the club's second cup title to this date.

== Further in Swiss football ==
- 1938–39 Nationalliga
- 1938–39 Swiss 1. Liga
- 1938–39 FC Basel season
- 1938–39 BSC Young Boys season

== Sources ==
- Fussball-Schweiz
- FCB Cup games 1938–39 at fcb-achiv.ch
- Switzerland 1938–39 at RSSSF

Preceded by 1937–38	Swiss Cup seasons	Succeeded by 1939–40
