= 1938–39 Nationalliga =

Swiss football season

Nationalliga
- Season: 1938–39
- Dates: 4 September 1938 to 30 April 1939
- Champions: Grasshopper Club
- Relegated: Basel
- Matches: 132
- Top goalscorer: Josef Artimovicz (Grenchen); 15 goals

The following is the summary of the Swiss National League in the 1938–39 football season. This was the 42nd season of top-tier football in Switzerland.

== Overview ==
At this time, the Swiss Football Association (ASF/SFV) had 12 member clubs in the top-tier and 24 clubs in the second-tier. The 12 top-tier teams played a double round-robin to decide their league table positions. Two points were awarded for a win and one point was awarded for a draw. The first placed team at the end of the season would be awarded the Swiss championship title and the last placed team would be relegated to the 1939–40 1. Liga.

== Nationalliga ==
The league season began with the first matchday on 4 September 1938 and was concluded with the last round on 30 April 1939.

=== Teams, locations ===
Team	Based in	Canton	Stadium	Capacity
FC Basel	Basel	Basel-Stadt	Landhof	4,000
FC Biel-Bienne	Biel/Bienne	Bern	Stadion Gurzelen	5,500
Grasshopper Club Zürich	Zürich	Zürich	Hardturm	20,000
FC Grenchen	Grenchen	Solothurn	Stadium Brühl	15,100
FC La Chaux-de-Fonds	La Chaux-de-Fonds	Neuchâtel	Centre Sportif de la Charrière	12,700
FC Lausanne-Sport	Lausanne	Vaud	Pontaise	30,000
FC Lugano	Lugano	Ticino	Cornaredo Stadium	6,330
FC Luzern	Lucerne	Lucerne	Stadion Allmend	25,000
FC Nordstern Basel	Basel	Basel-Stadt	Rankhof	7,600
Servette FC	Geneva	Geneva	Stade des Charmilles	27,000
Young Boys	Bern	Bern	Wankdorf Stadium	56,000
FC Young Fellows	Zürich	Zürich	Utogrund	2,850

=== Final league table ===
Pos	Team	Pld	W	D	L	GF	GA	GD	Pts	Qualification or relegation
1	Grasshopper Club	22	12	7	3	34	20	+14	31	Swiss Champions
2	Grenchen	22	10	7	5	38	30	+8	27	
3	Lugano	22	11	5	6	29	23	+6	27	
4	Servette	22	11	4	7	43	28	+15	26	
5	Nordstern Basel	22	8	7	7	29	24	+5	23	
6	Lausanne-Sport	22	8	6	8	34	28	+6	22	Swiss Cup winners
7	La Chaux-de-Fonds	22	9	4	9	29	41	−12	22	
8	Luzern	22	7	5	10	42	45	−3	19	
9	Young Fellows Zürich	22	6	6	10	29	31	−2	18	
10	Young Boys	22	4	9	9	22	35	−13	17	
11	Biel-Bienne	22	4	9	9	22	39	−17	17	
12	Basel	22	5	5	12	29	36	−7	15	Relegated to 1939–40 1. Liga

Source: rsssf.com
Rules for classification: 1) Points; 2) Goal difference within the league, however with play-off for qualifiers;

For the Grasshopper Club this was their ninth championship title.

=== Results ===
Home \ Away	BAS	BB	CDF	GCZ	GRE	LS	LUG	LUZ	NOR	SER	YB	YFZ
Basel		0–0	2–2	3–1	2–0	1–0	7–0	4–1	0–1	0–1	0–0	0–1
Biel-Bienne	4–1		2–0	0–0	1–4	1–1	1–1	2–2	0–0	0–0	0–1	2–1
La Chaux-de-Fonds	2–0	2–3		2–2	2–1	2–0	2–1	2–1	2–1	1–2	2–1	0–0
Grasshopper Club	4–0	3–1	3–1		1–0	2–1	2–1	3–1	0–0	2–1	0–0	2–0
Grenchen	3–2	3–1	4–1	1–1		1–0	1–0	1–1	3–1	2–1	2–4	2–2
Lausanne-Sports	2–0	3–0	6–0	1–1	1–2		1–1	3–1	1–1	2–1	4–0	2–1
Lugano	1–0	1–1	3–0	0–1	1–1	3–0		1–0	3–0	2–1	2–0	3–1
Luzern	4–3	5–1	2–3	3–1	2–2	3–1	1–2		2–1	2–4	1–0	5–2
Nordstern	4–1	2–1	3–0	1–0	2–0	1–2	2–0	1–1		1–1	0–1	1–1
Servette	2–1	6–0	2–0	2–3	1–1	2–2	0–1	3–1	3–0		2–1	2–5
Young Boys	1–1	1–1	1–1	1–1	2–2	1–1	0–0	5–2	1–5	1–3		0–3
Young Fellows	1–1	2–0	1–2	0–1	1–2	3–0	1–2	0–0	1–1	0–3	2–0	

Source: rsssf.com
Legend: Blue = home team win; Yellow = draw; Red = away team win.

=== Topscorers ===
Rank	Player	Nat.	Goals	Club
1.	Josef Artimovicz	(Austria)	15	Grenchen
2.	Georges Aeby	(Switzerland)	13	Servette
3.	Adolf Semp	(Austria)	12	Luzern

== Further in Swiss football ==
- 1938–39 Swiss Cup
- 1938–39 Swiss 1. Liga

== Sources ==
- Switzerland 1938–39 at RSSSF

Preceded by 1937–38	Nationalliga seasons in Switzerland	Succeeded by 1939–40
