= Rudolf Gyger =

Swiss footballer (1920–1996)

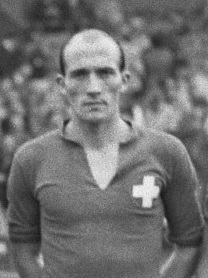
- Gyger with Switzerland in 1947

Personal information
- Date of birth: 16 April 1920
- Place of birth: Basel, Switzerland
- Date of death: 1996 (aged 75–76)
- Position: Defender

Senior career*
Years	Team	Apps	(Gls)
1937–1942	FC Nordstern Basel		
1942–1952	Cantonal Neuchâtel		
1952–1957	Servette		

International career
1945–1950	Switzerland	24	(0)
- * Club domestic league appearances and goals

Rudolf Gyger (16 April 1920 – 1996) was a Swiss football defender who played for Switzerland in the 1950 FIFA World Cup. He also played for FC Nordstern Basel, Cantonal Neuchâtel and Servette.
