= 1939–40 Swiss 1. Liga =

1. Liga
- Season: 1939–40
- Champions: 1. Liga champions: Basel; Group 1 winners: Vevey Sports; Group 2 winners: Fribourg; Group 3 winners: Basel; Group 4 winners: Brühl; Group 5 winners: Bellinzona
- Promoted: none
- Relegated: none
- Matches: 4x 30 and 1x 20 plus 10 play-offs

The 1939–40 1. Liga season was the 9th season of the 1. Liga since its creation in 1931. At this time, the 1. Liga was the second-tier of the Swiss football league system. Due to the outbreak the Second World War on 1 September 1939 the start of the Swiss football championship was postponed until 22 October. The 1. Liga was postponed until December and it was completely reorganised for this season.

== Overview ==
=== Preamble ===
In Switzerland during the second world war period, sport became an integral part of the "spiritual national defense". This was a political and cultural movement that had already become increasingly important during the late 1930s. Politicians, intellectuals and media professionals had increasingly called for measures to strengthen Switzerland's basic cultural values. Since the Nationalliga games were also considered to be one of the activities that seemed important for maintaining the morale of the population, the military authorities put considerably fewer obstacles in the way of the top players and leading clubs as they had during the previous World War.

Nevertheless, the outbreak of the Second World War, triggered by the German attack on Poland on 1 September 1939, was also a shock for Switzerland, although international signs had been pointing towards a war for some time. On 30 August, the Federal Assembly elected staff officer Henri Guisan as Commander-in-Chief of the Army. On 2 September, general mobilisation for war took place. The national exhibition in Zurich, during which the national football team had also played representative matches against teams from neighbouring countries, was closed for some time. The general mobilisation brought regular championship operations to a standstill, and in its place an improvised mobilisation championship was held without automatic promotion or relegation. In some cases the games could not be played or were postponed because the clubs did not have enough players available.

=== Format ===
The 12 teams of the top-tier competed the improvised championship as in the years before. However, the 24 clubs that competed in the 1. Liga were re-organised. This season they were divided into five regional groups (as opposed to two in previous years), this was done to reduce travelling times. There were six teams in group 1 (West), five teams in group 2 (North-West), group 3 (Central) and group 4 (North-East), but only three in group 5 (South). The teams in group 1 played a double round-robin to decide their league position. The teams in the groups 2, 3 and 4 played three round-robins and the teams in group 5 played four round-robins. Two points were awarded for a win and one point was awarded for a draw. The five group winners then contested a play-off round to decide the championship. This contested of: a two legged semi-final for the two west group winners, a three team round-robin semi-final for the other groups and then there was to be a two legged-final for the title of 1. Liga champions.

== Group 1 ==
=== Teams, locations ===
Club	Based in	Canton	Stadium	Capacity
Dopolavoro Genève	Genève	Geneva		
FC Monthey	Monthey	Valais	Stade Philippe Pottier	1,800
FC Montreux-Sports	Montreux	Vaud	Stade de Chailly	1,000
FC Forward Morges	Morges	Vaud	Parc des Sports	600
Urania Genève Sport	Genève	Geneva	Stade de Frontenex	4,000
Vevey Sports	Vevey	Vaud	Stade de Copet	4,000

=== Final league table ===
Pos	Team	Pld	W	D	L	GF	GA	GD	Pts	Qualification or relegation
1	Vevey Sports	10	9	0	1	39	13	+26	18	To play-offs
2	Urania Genève Sport	10	7	0	3	31	18	+13	14	
3	Dopolavoro Genève	10	5	1	4	29	26	+3	11	
4	FC Monthey	10	3	2	5	18	25	−7	8	
5	FC Forward Morges	10	3	1	6	20	20	0	7	
6	FC Montreux-Sports	10	0	2	8	8	43	−35	2	

Source: RSSSF
Rules for classification: 1) Points; 2) Goal difference within the league, but decider play-off for qualifiers.

== Group 2 ==
=== Teams, locations ===
Club	Based in	Canton	Stadium	Capacity
FC Bern	Bern	Bern	Stadion Neufeld	14,000
US Bienne-Boujean	Biel/Bienne	Bern		
FC Cantonal Neuchâtel	Neuchâtel	Neuchâtel	Stade de la Maladière	25,500
FC Étoile-Sporting	La Chaux-de-Fonds	Neuchâtel	Les Foulets / Terrain des Eplatures	1,000 / 500
FC Fribourg	Fribourg	Fribourg	Stade Universitaire	9,000

=== Final league table ===
Pos	Team	Pld	W	D	L	GF	GA	GD	Pts	Qualification or relegation
1	FC Fribourg	12	8	1	3	32	18	+14	17	To play-offs
2	FC Bern	12	7	0	5	38	19	+19	14	
3	FC Cantonal Neuchâtel	12	4	2	6	24	34	−10	10	
4	US Bienne-Boujean	12	4	2	6	21	39	−18	10	
5	FC Étoile-Sporting	12	3	3	6	27	32	−5	9	

Source: RSSSF
Rules for classification: 1) Points; 2) Goal difference within the league, but decider play-off for qualifiers.

== Group 3 ==
=== Teams, locations ===
Club	Based in	Canton	Stadium	Capacity
FC Aarau	Aarau	Aargau	Stadion Brügglifeld	9,240
FC Basel	Basel	Basel-Stadt	Landhof	4,000
FC Birsfelden	Birsfelden	Basel-Landschaft	Sternenfeld	9,400
FC Concordia Basel	Basel	Basel-Stadt	Stadion Rankhof	7,000
FC Solothurn	Solothurn	Solothurn	Stadion FC Solothurn	6,750

=== Final league table ===
Pos	Team	Pld	W	D	L	GF	GA	GD	Pts	Qualification or relegation
1	FC Basel	12	9	2	1	38	16	+22	20	To play-offs
2	FC Aarau	12	7	1	4	37	26	+11	15	
3	FC Concordia Basel	12	4	1	7	26	32	−6	9	
4	FC Solothurn	12	4	0	8	25	35	−10	8	
5	FC Birsfelden	12	4	0	8	14	31	−17	8	

Source: RSSSF
Rules for classification: 1) Points; 2) Goal difference within the league, but decider play-off for qualifiers.

== Group 4 ==
=== Teams, locations ===
Club	Based in	Canton	Stadium	Capacity
FC Blue Stars Zürich	Zürich	Zürich	Hardhof	1,000
SC Brühl	St. Gallen	St. Gallen	Paul-Grüninger-Stadion	4,200
SC Juventus Zürich	Zürich	Zürich	Utogrund	2,850
SC Zug	Zug	Zug	Herti Allmend Stadion	6,000
FC Zürich	Zürich	Zürich	Letzigrund	25,000

=== Final league table ===
Pos	Team	Pld	W	D	L	GF	GA	GD	Pts	Qualification or relegation
1	SC Brühl	12	8	3	1	31	15	+16	19	To play-offs
2	SC Zug	12	6	0	6	27	49	−22	12	
3	FC Zürich	12	4	3	5	39	25	+14	11	
4	FC Blue Stars Zürich	12	4	2	6	35	27	+8	10	
5	SC Juventus Zürich	12	3	2	7	19	35	−16	8	

Source: RSSSF
Rules for classification: 1) Points; 2) Goal difference within the league, but decider play-off for qualifiers.

== Group 5 ==
=== Teams, locations ===
Club	Based in	Canton	Stadium	Capacity
AC Bellinzona	Bellinzona	Ticino	Stadio Comunale Bellinzona	5,000
FC Chiasso	Chiasso	Ticino	Stadio Comunale Riva IV	4,000
FC Locarno	Locarno	Ticino	Stadio comunale Lido	5,000

=== Final league table ===
Pos	Team	Pld	W	D	L	GF	GA	GD	Pts	Qualification or relegation
1	AC Bellinzona	6	5	1	0	23	7	+16	11	To play-offs
2	FC Chiasso	7	3	0	4	14	28	−14	6	
3	FC Locarno	7	1	1	5	18	20	−2	3	

Source: RSSSF
Rules for classification: 1) Points; 2) Goal difference within the league, but decider play-off for qualifiers.

The matches Bellinzona–Locarno and Chiasso–Bellinzona were not played as they were irrelevant in determining the team classified in the final phase.

== Championship play-off ==
=== Semi-finals ===
The winners of the groups 1 and 2 played their matches on 30 June and 7 July 1940.

Team 1	Score	Team 2
Vevey Sports	Forfeit	Fribourg

Vevey did not play the match because the team had too few players due to the mobilisation. The game was awarded 0–3 for Fribourg

Team 1	Score	Team 2
Fribourg	2–1	Vevey Sports

Fribourg won and advanced to the final.

The three other group winners played a three team round-robin for the other finalist.

Pos	Team	Pld	W	D	L	GF	GA	GD	Pts	BRÜ	BAS	BEL
1	Brühl	2	1	1	0	5	3	+2	3	—	2–2	—
2	Basel	2	1	1	0	6	3	+3	3	—	—	4–1
3	Bellinzona	2	0	0	2	2	7	−5	0	1–3	—	—

Source: RSSSF
Rules for classification: 1) Points; 2) Head-to-head 3) Decider.

Due to the egality between two teams a play-off decider was required. This was played on 7 July in Basel.

Team 1	Score	Team 2
Basel	2–0	Brühl

=== Final ===
The games in the final were played on 4 and 11 August 1940.

Team 1	Score	Team 2
Fribourg	4–0	Basel
Basel	4–2	Fribourg

Due to the egality, one win each, a replay was required. This was played at Stadion Neufeld in Bern on 18 August.

Team 1	Score	Team 2
Fribourg	1–2	Basel

Basel won the 1. Liga championship title.

== Further in Swiss football ==
- 1939–40 Nationalliga
- 1939–40 Swiss Cup
- 1939–40 FC Basel season

== Sources ==
- Switzerland 1939–40 at RSSSF

Preceded by 1938–39	Seasons in Swiss 1. Liga	Succeeded by 1940–41
