= 1939–40 Nationalliga =

Swiss football season

Nationalliga
- Season: 1939–40
- Dates: 22 October 1939 to 14 July 1940
- Champions: Servette
- Relegated: None
- Matches: 132
- Top goalscorer: Georges Aeby (Servette); 22 goals

The following is the summary of the Swiss National League in the 1939–40 football season. This was the 43rd season of top-tier football in Switzerland. This was played as "Championnat Suisse de Mobilisation" due to the Second World War.

== Overview ==
=== Preamble ===
In Switzerland during the Second World War period, sport became an integral part of the "spiritual national defense". This was a political and cultural movement that had already become increasingly important during the late 1930s. Politicians, intellectuals and media professionals had increasingly called for measures to strengthen Switzerland's basic cultural values. Since the Nationalliga games were also considered to be one of the activities that seemed important for maintaining the morale of the population, the military authorities put considerably fewer obstacles in the way of the top players and leading clubs as they had during the previous World War.

Nevertheless, the outbreak of the Second World War, triggered by the German attack on Poland on 1 September 1939, was also a shock for Switzerland, although international signs had been pointing towards a war for some time. On 30 August, the Federal Assembly elected staff officer Henri Guisan as Commander-in-Chief of the Army. On 2 September, general mobilisation for war took place. The national exhibition in Zurich, during which the Swiss national football team had also played representative matches against teams from neighbouring countries, was closed for some time. The general mobilisation brought regular championship operations to a standstill, and in its place an improvised mobilisation championship was held without automatic promotion or relegation. In some cases the games could not be played or were postponed because the clubs did not have enough players available.

=== Format ===
At this time, the Swiss Football Association (ASF/SFV) had 12 member clubs in the top-tier and 24 clubs in the second-tier. The 12 top-tier teams played a double round-robin to decide their league table positions. Two points were awarded for a win and one point was awarded for a draw. The team in first place at the end of the season was awarded the Swiss championship title. As explained, this season there was no relegation from the Nationalliga, due to the special circumstances of the war championship. Due to the outbreak the Second World War the start of the championship was postponed. The first matchday was on 22 October 1939 and the season was concluded with the last two rounds which took place on 13 and 14 July 1940. To this date there were two unplayed postponed matches, these were rescheduled and played on 21 July. This seasons 1. Liga was postponed until December and it was completely re-organised for this season.

== Nationalliga ==
=== Teams, locations ===
Team	Based in	Canton	Stadium	Capacity
FC Biel-Bienne	Biel/Bienne	Bern	Stadion Gurzelen	5,500
Grasshopper Club Zürich	Zürich	Zürich	Hardturm	20,000
FC Grenchen	Grenchen	Solothurn	Stadium Brühl	15,100
FC La Chaux-de-Fonds	La Chaux-de-Fonds	Neuchâtel	Centre Sportif de la Charrière	12,700
FC Lausanne-Sport	Lausanne	Vaud	Pontaise	30,000
FC Lugano	Lugano	Ticino	Cornaredo Stadium	6,330
FC Luzern	Lucerne	Lucerne	Stadion Allmend	25,000
FC Nordstern Basel	Basel	Basel-Stadt	Rankhof	7,600
Servette FC	Geneva	Geneva	Stade des Charmilles	27,000
FC St. Gallen	St. Gallen	St. Gallen	Espenmoos	11,000
Young Boys	Bern	Bern	Wankdorf Stadium	56,000
FC Young Fellows	Zürich	Zürich	Utogrund	2,850

=== Final league table ===
Pos	Team	Pld	W	D	L	GF	GA	GD	Pts	Qualification or relegation
1	Servette	22	19	3	0	64	14	+50	41	Swiss champions
2	Grenchen	22	11	6	5	45	24	+21	28	
3	Grasshopper Club	22	10	6	6	45	30	+15	26	Swiss Cup winners
4	Lausanne-Sport	22	10	5	7	40	26	+14	25	
5	Young Boys	22	11	3	8	37	27	+10	25	
6	Lugano	22	12	1	9	46	38	+8	25	
7	La Chaux-de-Fonds	22	10	2	10	41	35	+6	22	
8	Luzern	22	9	2	11	39	43	−4	20	
9	Nordstern Basel	22	7	3	12	30	40	−10	17	
10	St. Gallen	22	5	3	14	27	63	−36	13	
11	Young Fellows Zürich	22	4	4	14	30	53	−23	12	
12	Biel-Bienne	22	3	4	15	19	70	−51	10	

Source: rsssf.com
Rules for classification: 1) Points; 2) Goal difference within the league, however with play-off for qualifiers;

This season there was no relegation.

=== Results ===
Home \ Away	BB	CDF	GCZ	GRE	LS	LUG	LUZ	NOR	SER	STG	YB	YFZ
Biel-Bienne		0–4	2–8	1–1	0–4	1–5	2–2	1–0	1–2	3–1	0–0	0–0
La Chaux-de-Fonds	6–0		1–4	0–1	2–0	4–3	3–0	4–1	0–1	1–2	2–0	4–2
Grasshopper Club	2–1	4–1		0–3	0–0	3–3	4–1	0–1	1–1	4–2	2–0	5–0
Grenchen	3–0	3–0	2–1		0–0	4–1	3–4	2–1	2–3	2–1	0–1	6–1
Lausanne-Sports	3–1	0–0	1–1	2–2		1–0	4–2	3–0	0–4	4–0	1–0	7–3
Lugano	– (Note: By decision of the sports judge, without result but as if it had been played: 0 points for both teams.)	4–1	2–0	1–0	2–0		2–1	0–2	2–3	3–0	5–1	4–1
Luzern	2–3	3–1	1–2	0–3	2–1	2–0		3–2	1–1	5–2	3–0	3–0
Nordstern	4–0	0–0	2–2	2–1	1–3	0–2	2–1		0–2	8–2	0–1	1–3
Servette	7–0	2–0	1–0	0–0	1–0	7–0	4–0	4–0		2–1	6–3	3–1
St. Gallen	6–2	1–3	1–1	3–2	2–1	3–2	1–2	0–0	0–4		0–2	1–1
Young Boys	3–0	3–1	2–0	0–1	2–1	4–1	3–0	4–0	1–4	6–0		0–0
Young Fellows	4–0	1–3	0–1	2–2	1–4	0–2	2–1	2–3	1–2	3–0	1–1	

Source: rsssf.com
Legend: Blue = home team win; Yellow = draw; Red = away team win.

=== Topscorers ===
Rank	Player	Nat.	Goals	Club
1.	Georges Aeby	(Switzerland)	22	Servette
2.	Fritz Wagner	(Switzerland)	15	La Chaux-de-Fonds
3.	Paul Aeby	(Switzerland)	14	Grenchen

== Further in Swiss football ==
- 1939–40 Swiss Cup
- 1939–40 Swiss 1. Liga

== Sources ==
- Switzerland 1939–40 at RSSSF

Preceded by 1938–39	Nationalliga seasons in Switzerland	Succeeded by 1940–41
