= 1903–04 FC Basel season =

FC Basel
1903–04 season
- Chairman: Ernst-Alfred Thalmann
- First team coach: Daniel Hug (as team captain)
- Ground: Landhof, Basel
- Serie A: Central group: third
- Top goalscorer: n/a (Note: The player lines-ups and goal scorers for 2 of the 9 league games in the 1903–04 season are unknown or incomplete.)
- Average home league attendance: n/a

The FC Basel 1903–04 season was their eleventh season in their existence. The club's chairman was Ernst-Alfred Thalmann, who took over the chairmanship at the AGM for the third time in the club's history. FC Basel played their home games in the Landhof in the Quarter Kleinbasel.

== Overview ==
With over 40 active footballers and over 70 patron members Basel were the second largest club in Switzerland at this time, larger was only Grasshopper Club Zürich. Basel's first team played in the Serie A and the second team in the Serie B.

Daniel Hug (the team's most prominent, their best and their largest player) was named as team captain and as captain he led the team trainings and was responsible for the line-ups. Together with goalkeeper Paul Hofer, the players Alphonse Schorpp, Eugen Strauss, Dr. Siegfried Pfeiffer, Ernst-Alfred Thalmann and Emil Hasler, Hug was one of many early national team players who came from the Basel team.

The team played just one pre-season friendly at home against Grasshopper Club. There was another mid-season friendly against local lower tier Nordstern Basel. During the winter break Basel played two more friendly matches. These were the return game against the Grasshoppers which was drawn 6–6 and also an away game against west group team Montriond Lausanne which was won 3–2. At the end of the season Basel played against group winners Old Boys, which was played as warm up the finals. They also played a match against French club Mulhouse, which was lost 6–8, the highest scoring game of the season.

The Swiss Serie A season 1903–04 was divided into three regional groups, east, central and west. Basel were allocated to the central group together with the Young Boys, FC Bern, Floria Biel/Bienne, and two further teams from Basel, Old Boys Basel and Fortuna Basel. Having lost their first six games of the season, local team Fortuna Basel opted out of the league season after the New Year and gave forfait for all their remaining games. FC Basel ended their ten games with five victories, two draws and three defeats in third position in the league table, obtaining 12 points, scoring 28 and conceding 25 goals. The Young Boys and the Old Boys ended level on points and so a play-off match was arranged. The Old Boys won the play-off 3–2 and therefore qualified for the finals.

In the finals St. Gallen first drew 1–1 against group west winners Servette, then they won 1–0 against central group winners Old Boys and because the Old Boys beat Servette 2–0, St. Gallen won their first ever championship title.

== Players ==
Note: Flags indicate national team as defined under FIFA eligibility rules; some limited exceptions apply. Players may hold more than one non-FIFA nationality.

No.	Pos.	Nation	Player
—	GK	(Switzerland) SUI	Paul Hofer
—	GK	(Switzerland) SUI	Eugen Stutz (Stutz I)
—	DF	(Switzerland) SUI	Daniel Hug (Captain)
—	DF	(Switzerland) SUI	Adolf Ramseyer
—	FW	(Switzerland) SUI	Emil Hasler
—	MF	(Switzerland) SUI	Eugen Strauss
—	FW	(Switzerland) SUI	Karl Gossweiler (Gossweiler II)
—	FW	(Switzerland) SUI	Dr. Siegfried Pfeiffer
—	MF	(Switzerland) SUI	Ernst-Alfred Thalmann (Thalmann I)
—		(Switzerland) SUI	Paul Egli
—		(Switzerland) SUI	Percy Kaufmann

No.	Pos.	Nation	Player
—		(Switzerland) SUI	Albert Klein
—		(Switzerland) SUI	Eduard Laubi
—		(Switzerland) SUI	P. Lozéron
—		(Switzerland) SUI	Hans Rietmann
—			? Strub
—		(Switzerland) SUI	Werner Stutz (Stutz II)
—		(Switzerland) SUI	Paul Thalmann (Thalmann III)
—			Artur Viehoff
—	FW	(Switzerland) SUI	Rudolf Gossweiler (Gossweiler I)
—		(Switzerland) SUI	Paul Nosch
—	MF	(Switzerland) SUI	Alphonse Schorpp

== Results ==
Legend

Win Draw Loss Forfait

=== Friendly matches ===
==== Pre-season ====
18 October 1903 Pre-season	Basel	2 – 1	Grasshopper Club	Landhof, Basel
	Goal	Summary	Goal	Referee: H. Gautschy, Old Boys
Note: Grasshopper Club played with 10 men.

6 December 1903 Mid-season	Basel	2 – 1	Nordstern Basel	Landhof, Basel
	Goal	Summary	Goal

==== Winter break and end of season ====
17 January 1904 Winter break	Grasshopper Club	6 – 6	Basel	Zürich
	Goal	Summary	Gossweiler II; Gossweiler II; Hasler; Hasler; Laubi; Pfeiffer	Referee: Seeburger

24 January 1904 Winter break	Montriond Lausanne	2 – 3	Basel	Lausanne
15:00	Pflüger 25' (1:1); 50' (2:2)	Summary	20' (0:1); 40' (1:2) Pfeiffer (2:3) Ramseyer

20 March 1904 End of season	Basel	1 – 3	Old Boys	Landhof, Basel
	Hasler	Summary	Seiffert; Schwarz; Gonser

10 April 1904 End of season	Mulhouse	8 – 6	Basel	Mulhouse
	Goal	Summary	Goal
Note: Binser and Hennrichs from Karlsruher FV played for Mulhouse.

=== Serie A ===
==== Central group matches ====
25 October 1903 Round 1	Basel	3 – 1	Fortuna Basel	Landhof, Basel
	Gossweiler II; Hasler; Thalmann I	Summary	Goal

1 November 1903 Round 2	FC Bern	2 – 2	Basel	Bern
	Goal	Summary	Goal

8 November 1903 Round 3	Floria Biel-Bienne	2 – 4	Basel	Biel/Bienne
15:00	Cooper 15' (1:0); Minondo 88' (2:4)	Summary	(1:1) Thalmann I (1:2) Hasler (1:3) Gossweiler II (1:4) Hug	Referee: (Switzerland) Christen, FC Bern

15 November 1903 Round 4	Old Boys	5 – 1	Basel	Basel
	Seiffert (1:0); Landerer 10' (2:0); Bolliger (3:1); Bolliger (4:1); Schwarz (5:1)	Summary	(2:1) Pfeiffer	Referee: (Switzerland) Christen, FC Bern

22 November 1903 Round 5	Young Boys	7 – 2	Basel	Spitalacker, Bern
15:10	Kratz 15' (1:0); Kämpfer (2:0); O. Schwab (3:2) (4:2) (5:2) (6:2) (7:2)	Summary	(2:1) (2:2) Hasler	Referee: (Switzerland) Frey, Old Boys

20 December 1903 Round 6	Basel	2 – 6	Old Boys	Landhof, Basel
	Goal	Summary	Buser; Buser; Buser; Schwarz; Schwarz; Kupferschmid

14 February 1904 Round 7	Fortuna Basel	0 – 3 FF	Basel	Landhof, Basel
		Summary
Note: Fortuna Basel did not play this game and on 25 February 1904 gave forfait for all their remaining games.

21 February 1904 Round 8	Basel	3 – 0	FC Bern	Landhof, Basel
	Pfeiffer 40' (1:0); Gossweiler II (2:0); Hasler (3:0)	Summary		Referee: (Switzerland) Frey

28 February 1904 Round 9	Basel	6 – 0	Floria Biel/Bienne	Landhof, Basel
	Gossweiler II; Gossweiler II; Pfeiffer; Pfeiffer; Hug; Ramseyer	Summary		Referee: (Switzerland) Frey

13 March 1904 Round 10	Basel	2 – 2	Young Boys	Landhof, Basel
	Goal	Summary	Goal	Referee: (Switzerland) Frey

==== Central group league table ====
Pos	Team	Pld	W	D	L	GF	GA	GD	Pts	Qualification
1	Old Boys	10	8	1	1	41	11	+30	17	Play-off winners, advance to finals
2	Young Boys	10	8	1	1	37	14	+23	17	Play-off
3	Basel	10	5	2	3	28	25	+3	12	
4	FC Bern	10	3	3	4	19	20	−1	9	
5	Floria Biel/Bienne	10	2	1	7	11	38	−27	5	Relegated
6	Fortuna Basel (Note: The last four games of Fortuna Basel were awarded 3–0 forfait for their opponents.)	10	0	0	10	4	32	−28	0	Withdrawn and relegated

Source: rsssf

Note to Fortuna Basel

== See also ==
- History of FC Basel
- List of FC Basel players
- List of FC Basel seasons

== Notes ==
=== Footnotes ===
1903–1904 season matches: Bern-FCB, FCB-OB

=== Sources ===
- Rotblau: Jahrbuch Saison 2014/2015. Publisher: FC Basel Marketing AG. ISBN 978-3-7245-2027-6
- Die ersten 125 Jahre. Publisher: Josef Zindel im Friedrich Reinhardt Verlag, Basel. ISBN 978-3-7245-2305-5
- Switzerland 1903-04 at RSSSF

(NB: Despite all efforts, the editors of these books and the authors in "Basler Fussballarchiv" have failed to be able to identify all the players, their date and place of birth or date and place of death, who played in the games during the early years of FC Basel. Most of the documentation is missing.)
