= 1904–05 FC Basel season =

FC Basel
1904–05 season
- Chairman: Ernst-Alfred Thalmann
- First team coach: Eugen Strauss (as team captain)
- Ground: Landhof, Basel
- Serie A: Central group 4th
- Top goalscorer: n/a (Note: The player lines-ups and goal scorers for 3 of the 8 league games in the 1904–05 season are unknown or incomplete.)
- Average home league attendance: n/a

The FC Basel 1904–05 season was their twelfth season in their existence. The club's chairman was Ernst-Alfred Thalmann, who was chairman for the second consecutive year. FC Basel played their home games in the Landhof in the Quarter Kleinbasel.

== Overview ==
Eugen Strauss was team captain and as captain he led the team trainings and was responsible for the line-ups. The team played just two pre-season friendlies, one in France against Mulhouse and one in Zürich against Grasshopper Club. The game against Mulhouse was won 8–1 the return match four months later in the Landhof was only drawn. The match against the Grasshoppers ended in a defeat. In the winter break the team travelled to Germany. They played against 1. FC Pforzheim on Christmas day and were defeated 7–3. On boxing day they played a game against Karlsruher FV and managed a draw. At the end of the season the team travelled again to Germany and were defeated 5–1 by Freiburger FC.

The seventh league championship, Swiss Serie A season 1904–05, was divided into three regional groups, east, central and west. Basel were allocated to the central group together with the Young Boys, FC Bern, Weissenbühl Bern and Old Boys Basel. This season was a sportingly very disappointing season for Basel. There were just two victories from eight games, both times against Weissenbühl Bern. The away game was won 9–2 and the return match 3–0. Weissenbühl Bern lost all their eight games and were relegated at the end of the season with a goal tally of five scored and 52 conceded. Basel's other six games all ended in defeats and they landed in second last position in the group table, scoring 18 and conceding 20 goals.

In the central group Young Boys Bern and the Old Boys Basel ended the season level on points as they did the year before and so a play-off match was arranged (see also foot note below). This time the Young Boys won the play-off with 2–1 and therefore they qualified for the finals. In the finals Grasshopper Club won both their matches and became Swiss champions for the third time in seven years.

== Players ==
Definite squad members

Note: Flags indicate national team as defined under FIFA eligibility rules; some limited exceptions apply. Players may hold more than one non-FIFA nationality.

No.	Pos.	Nation	Player
—	GK	(Switzerland) SUI	Pierre Chevalley
—	GK	(Switzerland) SUI	Paul Hofer
—	GK	(Switzerland) SUI	Eugen Stutz (Stutz I)
—	FW	(Switzerland) SUI	Daniel Hug
—	DF	(Switzerland) SUI	Adolf Ramseyer
—	FW	(Switzerland) SUI	Emil Hasler
—	DF	(Switzerland) SUI	Eugen Strauss
—	DF	(Switzerland) SUI	P. Vaney
—	FW		Manuel Bourgeois
—	FW	(Switzerland) SUI	Karl Hans Gossweiler (Gossweiler II)

No.	Pos.	Nation	Player
—	MF	(Switzerland) SUI	Ernst-Alfred Thalmann
—	FW	(Switzerland) SUI	Dr. Siegfried Pfeiffer
—		(Switzerland) SUI	Percy Kaufmann (Kaufmann I)
—		(Switzerland) SUI	Edwin Kaufmann (Kaufmann II)
—		(Switzerland) SUI	Georg Michoud
—			Fritz Runkel
—			Hugo Sarcander
—			Hans Schaub
—			Heinrich Schiess
—			Emil Vogt

Probable squad members

Note: Flags indicate national team as defined under FIFA eligibility rules; some limited exceptions apply. Players may hold more than one non-FIFA nationality.

No.	Pos.	Nation	Player
—	FW	(Switzerland) SUI	Rudolf Karl Gossweiler (Gossweiler I)
—		(Switzerland) SUI	P. Lozéron
—		(Switzerland) SUI	A. Klein
—		(Switzerland) SUI	Eduard Laubi

No.	Pos.	Nation	Player
—		(Switzerland) SUI	Paul Nosch
—		(Switzerland) SUI	Werner Stutz (Stutz II)
—		(Switzerland) SUI	Paul Thalmann (Thalmann III)
—			Artur Viehoff

== Results ==
Legend

Win Draw Loss

=== Friendly matches ===
==== Pre-season ====
October 1904 Pre-season	Mulhouse	1 – 8	Basel	Mulhouse
	Goal	Summary	Goal

13 October 1904 Pre-season	Grasshopper Club	2 – 1	Basel	Zürich
	Goal	Summary	Goal

==== Winter break and end of season ====
25 December 1904 Winter break	1. FC Pforzheim	7 – 3	Basel	Pforzheim
	Goal	Summary	Goal

26 December 1904 Winter break	Karlsruher FV	4 – 4	Basel	Karlsruhe
	Goal	Summary	Goal

12 February 1905 Winter break	Basel	2 – 2	Mulhouse	Landhof, Basel
	(Kaufmann I) 15' (1:0); Bourgeois 60' (2:1)	Summary	57' (1:1) Helmboldt; 66' (2:2) Helmboldt	Referee: Seiffert, Old Boys

26 March 1905 End of season	Freiburger FC	5 – 1	Basel	Freiburg im Breisgau
	(1:0) (2:1) (3:1) (4:1) (5:1)	Summary	(1:1) Hasler

16 April 1905 End of season	Basel	1 – 0	Young Fellows Zürich	Landhof, Basel
15:00	(1:0)	Summary

24 April 1905 End of season	La Chaux-de-Fonds	4 – 4	Basel	Parc des Sports, La Chaux-de-Fonds
14:00	Goal	Summary	Goal

=== Serie A ===
==== Central group matches ====
16 October 1904 Round 1	Basel	0 – 5	Old Boys	Landhof, Basel
15:00		Summary	(0:1) Graf (0:2) Seiffert (0:3) Wächter (0:4) Seiffert (0:5) Seiffert

23 October 1904 Round 2	Weissenbühl Bern	2 – 9	Basel	Allmend, Bern
15:00	(1:7) (2:8)	Summary	(0:1) Gossweiler II (0:2) Gossweiler II (0:3) Kaufmann II (0:4) Chevalley (0:5) Thalmann I (0:6) Gossweiler II (0:7) Hug (1:8) Thalmann I (2:9) Hug	Referee: (Switzerland) C. Christen, (FC Bern)

30 October 1904 Round 3	Young Boys	3 – 1	Basel	Spitalacker, Bern
15:30	(1:1) (2:1) (3:1)	Summary	(o.g. 0:1) Hess	Referee: (Switzerland) R. Studer, (FC Bern)

13 November 1904 Round 4	Basel	1 – 2	FC Bern	Landhof, Basel
14:30	Goal	Summary	Goal	Referee: (Switzerland)
Note: Karl Hans Gossweiler broke his leg during the first half and according to the report in "Football" he was replaced by Pierre Chevalley, but Chevalley probably only took his position, as substitutions were not common at that time.

20 November 1904 Round 5	Old Boys	2 – 0	Basel	Margarethenwiese, Basel
15:00	(1:0) (2:0)	Summary

27 November 1904 Round 6	Basel	3 – 0	Weissenbühl Bern	Landhof, Basel
15:00	Kaufmann I (1:0) (2:0) (3:0)	Summary

26 February 1905 Round 7	Basel	3 – 4	Young Boys	Landhof, Basel
	Goal	Summary	Goal

5 March 1905 Round 8	FC Bern	2 – 1	Basel	Bern
	(1:1) (2:1)	Summary	(0:1)	Referee: (Switzerland) R. Bell, (Young Boys)

==== Central group league table ====
Pos	Team	Pld	W	D	L	GF	GA	GD	Pts	Qualification
1	Young Boys	8	6	1	1	35	10	+25	13	Play-off winners, advance to finals
2	Old Boys	8	6	1	1	27	5	+22	13	Play-off
3	FC Bern	8	4	2	2	14	12	+2	10	
4	Basel	8	2	0	6	18	20	−2	4	
5	Weissenbühl Bern	8	0	0	8	5	52	−47	0	

Source: rsssf

NB: the match FC Basel - Young Boys Bern ended with the final score 3-4. Falsely, however, the result was originally reported as a 4-4 draw. Thus Old Boys would have finished in first position and were nominated as participants for the finals. After the mistake was noticed the W-D-L records and points totals in the league table were corrected and the necessary play-off match was arranged. However, the total goals remained without modification and consequently this leads to the fact that most older sources list the goal records for Young Boys and FC Basel as 35-11 and 19-20 respectively. Obviously this is arithmetically incorrect.

== See also ==
- History of FC Basel
- List of FC Basel players
- List of FC Basel seasons

== Notes ==
=== Footnotes ===
1904–1905 season matches: FCB-Bern, OB-FCB, FCB-YB

== Sources ==
- Rotblau: Jahrbuch Saison 2014/2015. Publisher: FC Basel Marketing AG. ISBN 978-3-7245-2027-6
- Die ersten 125 Jahre. Publisher: Josef Zindel im Friedrich Reinhardt Verlag, Basel. ISBN 978-3-7245-2305-5
- Switzerland 1904-05 at RSSSF

(NB: Despite all efforts, the editors of these books and the authors in "Basler Fussballarchiv" have failed to be able to identify all the players, their date and place of birth or date and place of death, who played in the games during the early years of FC Basel. Most of the documentation is missing.)
