= 1902–03 FC Basel season =

FC Basel
1902–03 season
- Chairman: Ernst-Alfred Thalmann; Josy Ebinger
- First team coach: Alphonse Schorpp (as team captain)
- Ground: Thiersteinerallee, until 16 November; Landhof, from 23 November
- Serie A: Central group: third
- Top goalscorer: Emil Hasler (3)
- Average home league attendance: n/a

The FC Basel 1902–03 season was their tenth season in their existence. The club's chairman was Ernst-Alfred Thalmann, who had taken over the position for the second time, he stood down at the AGM and Josy Ebinger was elected. He became the fifth chairman in the club's history. FC Basel first played their home games in the Thiersteinerallee and later they returned to the Landhof.

== Overview ==
=== Football ground ===
To the start of the previous season the club was forced to find a new playing field, because the new co-tenants of the Landhof built a concrete bowling alley in the middle of the grounds. Thus the FC Basel first and reserve teams then had to play their games elsewhere. They eventually found a suitable field beside the Thiersteinerallee, in the south-east of the city. To the beginning of the 1902–03 Swiss Serie A season the teams also played their games there. Towards the end of the year 1902 the club met an agreement with the owner of the Landhof, Mrs Katharina Ehrler-Wittich, and the club was able to return to their original domicile. At the cost of 150 Swiss Francs the club members removed the bowling alley and made the pitch playable once again.

=== Football season ===
Alphonse Schorpp was the team captain for the third successive season and as captain he led the team trainings and was responsible for the line-ups. There is no documentation that shows that there were pre-season friendly games this season, although the domestic league did not start until November. However, because the league season ended early there were friendlies added directly afterwards. A curiosity that comes to note is, that there were two games against French team Mulhouse. Directly after the league group had been completed, the first game at the Landhof was won 8–1 and had five different goal scorers. The return match, held just two weeks later, was lost 0–5.

The Swiss Serie A season 1902–03 was divided into three regional groups. There were six teams in the east group, five teams in the central and four teams in the west group. Basel were allocated to the central group together with two teams from the capital Young Boys and FC Bern and two further teams from region Basel, these being Old Boys Basel and Fortuna Basel. A curiosity during the championship was the match against Fortuna. The game was abandoned in the 70th minute, because the Fortuna players left the field in protest against a sending off. The referee commission, which was responsible in such cases as a court of arbitration, decided let the score count as end result. Fortuna were later disqualified by the Swiss Football Association due to incidents in the match against Old Boys. The decision was that the results of the previously played matches would remain in the league table, but the remaining matches were not played and not awarded.

Basel completed the central division as the only team with eight games. They had three victories and five defeats with thus six points, 13 to 20 goals. Basel were in third position in the table, six points behind Young Boys who won the group one point ahead of Old Boys. Young Boys therefore qualified for the finals. Here YB won both matches and became Swiss champions.

== Players ==
Note: Flags indicate national team as defined under FIFA eligibility rules; some limited exceptions apply. Players may hold more than one non-FIFA nationality.

No.	Pos.	Nation	Player
—	GK	(Switzerland) SUI	Paul Hofer
—	GK	(Switzerland) SUI	Eugen Stutz (Stutz I)
—	DF	(Switzerland) SUI	Daniel Hug
—	DF	(Switzerland) SUI	Adolf Ramseyer
—	MF	(Switzerland) SUI	Hans Riggenbach (Riggenbach II)
—	MF	(Switzerland) SUI	Emil Hasler
—	MF	(Switzerland) SUI	Alphonse Schorpp
—	MF	(Switzerland) SUI	Eugen Strauss
—	FW	(Switzerland) SUI	Rudolf Gossweiler (Gossweiler I)
—	FW	(Switzerland) SUI	Karl Gossweiler (Gossweiler II)
—	MF	(Switzerland) SUI	Ernst-Alfred Thalmann (Thalmann I)
—	FW	(Switzerland) SUI	Dr. Siegfried Pfeiffer

No.	Pos.	Nation	Player
—			(?) Clarasso
—			Max Hendrichs
—		(Switzerland) SUI	Percy Kaufmann (Kaufmann I)
—		(Switzerland) SUI	Albert Klein
—	FW	(Switzerland) SUI	Rudolf Landerer
—		(Switzerland) SUI	Eduard Laubi
—			(?) Lee
—			P. Lozéron
—			Emil Meyer
—			Paul Nosch
—		(Switzerland) SUI	Hans Rietmann
—		(Switzerland) SUI	Werner Stutz (Stutz II)
—		(Switzerland) SUI	Paul Thalmann (Thalmann III)

== Results ==
Legend

Win Draw Loss Forfait

=== Friendly matches ===
==== End of season ====
15 March 1903 End of season	Basel	8 – 1	Mulhouse	Landhof, Basel
	Laubi 2x Schorpp 2x Gossweiler I 2x Gossweiler II 1x Hasler 1x	Summary	Goal	Attendance: 200

29 March 1903 End of season	Mulhouse	5 – 0	Basel	Mulhouse
	(1:0) (2:0) (3:0) (4:0) (5:0)	Summary

26 April 1903 End of season	Basel	1 – 2	Nordstern Basel	Landhof, Basel
	Goal	Summary	Goal

10 May 1903 End of season	Basel	3 – 2	Strassburger FV	Landhof, Basel
10:15	Schorpp 1x Gossweiler II 1x Hasler 1x	Summary	Goal

17 May 1903 End of season	Basel	5 – 1	FC Neuchâtel	Landhof, Basel
	Goal	Summary	Goal

=== Serie A ===
==== Central group matches ====
2 November 1902 Round 1	Basel	1 – 4	FC Bern	Thiersteinerallee, Basel
	Landerer	Summary	Ochsenbein; Artigue; Kehrli; Kehrli	Referee: (Switzerland) Huguenin, (Zürich)

9 November 1902 Round 2	FC Fortuna Basel	0 – 4	Basel	Basel
		Summary	1x Landerer; 1x Hug; 2x Laubi

16 November 1902 Round 3	Basel	0 – 7	Young Boys	Thiersteinerallee, Basel
		Summary	Kratz; O. Schwab
Note: Paul Hofer had to leave the field at the beginning of the game due to a sprain, therefore FCB had to play practically the whole match with just ten players

23 November 1902 Round 4	Basel	1 – 2	Old Boys	Landhof, Basel
	Hasler (1:0)	Summary	(1:1) Senn (1:2) Senn	Referee: (Switzerland) A. Lalive, (La Chaux-de-Fonds)

30 November 1902 Round 5	Basel	2 – 0	FC Fortuna Basel	Landhof, Basel
	Schorpp (1:0); Hug (2:0)	Summary		Referee: (Switzerland) Ankersmith, (Grasshopper Club)
Note: The game was abandoned in the 70th minute, because the Fortuna players left the field in protest against a sending off. The referee commission, which was responsible in such cases, as a court of arbitration, decided let the score count as end result.

15 February 1903 Round 6	FC Bern	0 – 3 FF	Basel	Bern
		Summary
Note: FC Bern refused to play because, in their opinion, their own ground was unplayable

22 February 1903 Round 7	Old Boys	3 – 0	Basel	Thiersteinerallee, Basel
	Senn 30' (1:0); Seiffert (2:0); Riggenbach II 85' (o.g. 3:0)	Summary

1 March 1903 Round 8	Young Boys	4 – 2	Basel	Spitalacker, Bern
15:25	Kratz (1:0) (2_0); Kämpfer (3:0); Kratz (4:2)	Summary	(3:1) Hasler (3:2) Hasler	Attendance: 500; Referee: (Switzerland) Ducommun, FC La Chaux-de-Fonds

==== Central group league table ====
Pos	Team	Pld	W	D	L	GF	GA	GD	Pts	Qualification
1	Young Boys	7	6	0	1	29	5	+24	12	Advance to finals
2	Old Boys	7	5	1	1	16	7	+9	11	
3	Basel	8	3	0	5	13	20	−7	6	
4	FC Bern	7	1	1	5	10	21	−11	3	
5	Fortuna Basel	5	1	0	4	3	18	−15	2	Disqualified (Note: Fortuna were disqualified due to incidents in the match against Old Boys. Their last three games were not played and not awarded.)

Source: rsssf

== See also ==
- History of FC Basel
- List of FC Basel players
- List of FC Basel seasons

== Notes ==
=== Sources ===
- Rotblau: Jahrbuch Saison 2014/2015. Publisher: FC Basel Marketing AG. ISBN 978-3-7245-2027-6
- Die ersten 125 Jahre. Publisher: Josef Zindel im Friedrich Reinhardt Verlag, Basel. ISBN 978-3-7245-2305-5
- FCB squad 1902-03 at Basler Fussballarchiv
- Switzerland 1902-03 at RSSSF

(NB: Despite all efforts, the editors of these books and the authors in "Basler Fussballarchiv" have failed to be able to identify all the players, their date and place of birth or date and place of death, who played in the games during the early years of FC Basel. Most of the documentation is incomplete.)
