= 1905–06 FC Basel season =

FC Basel
1905–06 season
- Chairman: Ernst-Alfred Thalmann
- First team coach: Daniel Hug (as team captain)
- Ground: Landhof, Basel
- Serie A: Central group 4th
- Top goalscorer: n/a (Note: The player lines-ups and goal scorers for 4 of the 6 league games in the 1905–06 season are unknown or incomplete.)
- Average home league attendance: n/a

The FC Basel 1905–06 season was their thirteenth season since the club was formed. The club's chairman was Ernst-Alfred Thalmann, who was chairman for the third consecutive year, in his third presidential term. FC Basel played their home games in the Landhof in the district Basel-Wettstein in Kleinbasel, Basel.

== Overview ==
Daniel Hug was team captain and as captain he led the team trainings and was responsible for the line-ups. Basel played six pre-season friendlies, three at home in the Landhof and three away. Two of the teams that Basel hosted were from Germany Freiburger FC and 1. FC Pforzheim. During the winter break the team travelled to Germany to play an away game against Mannheimer FG 1896. They also travelled to Italy and played twice against Genoa CFC, winning 5–1 on New Years Eve and 5–4 on New Years day. After the league season the team again travelled to Italy and played twice against AC Milan, winning 5–2 on Easter Sunday and 5–1 on Easter Monday.

The Swiss Serie A season 1905–06 was divided into three regional areas, a west, a central and an eastern, whereas the east was divided into two groups. Basel were allocated to the central group together with Young Boys, FC Bern and Old Boys Basel. The league was played one match in October, two in November and again one match in February and two in Match. This season was disappointing for the team, because it resulted in solely two victories from six matches. Both victories were against local rivals Old Boys. Basel ended the qualification to the finals in bottom position in the group table. In their six championship matches they scored 11 and conceded 17 goals. Young Boys Bern qualified for the finals, which were played in April and May. East group winners won both their final pairings and became Swiss champions for the first time in the club's history.

== Players ==
Definite squad members

Note: Flags indicate national team as defined under FIFA eligibility rules; some limited exceptions apply. Players may hold more than one non-FIFA nationality.

No.	Pos.	Nation	Player
—	GK	SUI	Pierre Chevalley
—	FW	SUI	Dr. Siegfried Pfeiffer
—	FW	SUI	Daniel Hug (Captain)
—	DF	SUI	Adolf Ramseyer
—	MF	GER	Josef Goldschmidt
—	FW	SUI	Emil Hasler
—	DF	SUI	Eugen Strauss
—	MF		P. Vaney
—	MF		Oskar Zwimpfer

No.	Pos.	Nation	Player
—	FW	SUI	Karl Gossweiler
—			K. Heilig
—	FW	SUI	Ernst-Alfred Thalmann
—			Fritz Runkel
—			Gürtler
—			A. Guignard
—			Feissly
—			L. Fallet
—			Edmond Bédat

== Results ==
Legend

Win Draw Loss

=== Friendly matches ===
==== Pre-season ====
3 September 1905 Pre-season	St. Gallen	2–0	Basel	St. Gallen
	Goal	Summary

10 September 1905 Pre-season	Basel	3–3	Freiburger FC	Landhof, Basel
	Goal	Summary	Goal

1 October 1905 Pre-season	Basel	1–3	1. FC Pforzheim	Landhof, Basel
	Goal	Summary	Goal

8 October 1905 Pre-season	Montriond Lausanne	0–5	Basel	Lausanne
		Summary	Goal

15 October 1905 Pre-season	Basel	1–3	Grasshopper Club	Landhof, Basel
15:00	Goal	Summary	Goal

23 October 1905 Pre-season	Young Boys	2–5	Basel	Spitalacker, Bern
14:30	Goal	Summary	Goal

==== Winter break to end of season ====
4 December 1905 Winter break	Basel	3–2	Young Boys	Landhof, Basel
14:30	Goal	Summary	Goal

17 December 1905 Winter break	Mannheimer FG 1896	0–4	Basel	Mannheim
		Summary	Goal

31 December 1905 Winter break	Genoa CFC	1–5	Basel	Genoa
	Goal	Summary	Goal

1 January 1906 Winter break	Genoa CFC	4–5	Basel	Genoa
	Goal	Summary	Goal

7 January 1906 Winter break	Freiburger FC	3–1	Basel	Freiburg im Breisgau
	Goal	Summary	Goal

8 April 1906 End of season	Young Fellows Zürich	2–4	Basel	Zürich
	Goal	Summary	Goal

15 April 1906 End of season	AC Milan	2–5	Basel	Milan
	(1:4) (2:4)	Summary	(0:1) Pfeiffer (0:2) (0:3) (0:4) (2:5)

16 April 1906 End of season	AC Milan	1–5	Basel	Milan
	Widmer (1:4)	Summary	(0:1) (0:2) (0:3) (0:4) (1:5)

29 April 1906 End of season	Basel	1–4	Mannheimer FG 1896	Landhof, Basel
16:00	Goal	Summary	Goal

13 May 1906 End of season	Basel	2–2	Mulhouse	Landhof, Basel
15:00	Goldschmidt 18' (1:0); Hasler 63' (2:1)	Summary	43' (1:1) Helmboldt

20 May 1906 End of season	Strassburger FV	2–2	Basel	Strasbourg
15:30	Badermann 13' (1:0); Graeff 87' (2:2)	Summary	33' (1:1); 56' (1:2)

=== Serie A ===
==== Central group results ====
29 October 1905 Round 1	Basel	2–1	Old Boys	Landhof, Basel
	Goal	Summary	Goal

5 November 1905 Round 2	Basel	2–3	FC Bern	Landhof, Basel
	Goal	Summary	Goal

12 November 1905 Round 3	Young Boys	3–1	Basel	Spitalacker, Bern
15:00	Goal	Summary	Goal

18 February 1906 Round 4	Basel	4–7	Young Boys	Landhof, Basel
	Goal	Summary	Goal

11 March 1906 Round 5	FC Bern	2–0	Basel	Spitalacker, Bern
15:00	(1:0) (2:0)	Summary		Referee: (Switzerland) Bleuler, (Grasshopper Club)

18 March 1906 Round 6	Old Boys	1–2	Basel	Margarethenwiese, Basel
15:00	Wächter (1:0)	Summary	(1:1) Emil Hasler (1:2) Karl Gossweiler

==== Central group league table ====
Pos	Team	Pld	W	D	L	GF	GA	GD	Pts	Qualification
1	Young Boys	6	3	3	0	20	12	+8	9	Advance to finals
2	FC Bern	6	3	1	2	13	12	+1	7	
3	Old Boys	6	1	2	3	8	11	−3	4	
4	Basel	6	2	0	4	11	17	−6	4	

Source: rsssf

== See also ==
- History of FC Basel
- List of FC Basel players
- List of FC Basel seasons

== Notes ==
=== Footnotes ===
1905–1906 season matches: FCB-OB, FCB-Bern, YB-FCB, FCB-YB

=== Sources ===
- Rotblau: Jahrbuch Saison 2014/2015. Publisher: FC Basel Marketing AG. ISBN 978-3-7245-2027-6
- Switzerland 1905-06 at RSSSF
- FCB team 1905-06 at fcb-archiv.ch

(NB: Despite all efforts, the editors of these books and the authors in "Basler Fussballarchiv" have failed to be able to identify all the players, their date and place of birth or date and place of death, who played in the games during the early years of FC Basel. Most of the documentation is missing.)
