= 1907–08 FC Basel season =

FC Basel
1907–08 season
- Chairman: Dr. Siegfried Pfeiffer
- First team coach: Daniel Hug (as team captain)
- Ground: Landhof, Basel
- Serie A: Group Stage: Third
- Top goalscorer: Siegfried Pfeiffer (7); Max Senn (7)
- Average home league attendance: n/a

The FC Basel 1907–08 season was their fifteenth season since the club was formed. The club's chairman was Dr. Siegfried Pfeiffer, it was his first presidential term. FC Basel played their home games in the Landhof.

== Overview ==
First, a mention to the football ground Landhof. The first ever international match between the Swiss national team and the German national team was scheduled to take place here in April 1908. Therefore, the authorities decided to build the first spectator stand in Switzerland, at the cost of four thousand Swiss Francs and a building time of more than six months. Following this, the ground was used a number of times as international venue.

Second, a mention to club chairman Siegfried Pfeiffer, who had joined the club in 1899. During his presidential term for the club, he played his only international game for his country. Pfeiffer scored two goals in this legendary 5–3 victory over Germany.

Then, a mention to team captain Daniel Hug. It was his third year in succession as captain and he also played in the afore mentioned international game. Hug was Basel's most prominent and their largest player and as captain he led the team trainings and was responsible for the line-ups. It would end out, that at the end of the season he would transferred to Italy, to play professionally for Genoa C.F.C. in the Italian football championship.

Before the season started, Basel played three test games, in La Chaux-de-Fonds, in Freiburg im Breisgau and in Strassburg. They lost the first two games but came home with a 10–0 victory over FC Frankonia 1900 Strassburg. They also played four friendly games during the winter break. The first in their home stadium against Strassburger FV. The other three were away, the first game in Geneva. Over the Christmas period the team travelled to Mannheim and Hanau to play Mannheimer FG 1896 and 1. Hanauer FC 1893. The first was won the second ended in a defeat.

The 1907–08 Serie A was divided into two regional groups, an east group and a west group. Together with local rivals Old Boys, Basel were allocated to the east group. The other teams in that group were Aarau, Grasshopper Club, Zürich, Young Fellows Zürich, Winterthur and St. Gallen. The group was an evenly balanced group and at the end of the season the teams from second to eighth position were only separated by six points. Only Winterthur had a good run of results and were able to move clear at the top of the league table, winning the group with a six-point advantage.

Thus Winterthur qualified for the league final, which was held in Basel on 31 May 1908. Winterthur won the Swiss Championship title beating Young Boys Bern by four goals to one.

== Players ==
Squad members

Note: Flags indicate national team as defined under FIFA eligibility rules; some limited exceptions apply. Players may hold more than one non-FIFA nationality.

No.	Pos.	Nation	Player
—	GK		? Persenico
—		SUI	Ernesto Persenico
—	GK	SUI	Fridolin Wenger
—	GK	SUI	Jules Fingerlin
—	MF	SUI	Daniel Hug
—	DF	SUI	Adolf Ramseyer
—	MF	GER	Josef Goldschmidt
—	MF	SUI	Emil Hasler

No.	Pos.	Nation	Player
—	MF	SUI	Max Palatini
—	FW	SUI	Christian Albicker (I)
—	FW	SUI	Ernst Gossweiler
—	FW		? Kunz
—	FW	SUI	Dr. Siegfried Pfeiffer
—	FW	SUI	Max Senn
—	FW	GER	Alfred Stöhrmann
—	FW	SUI	Ernst-Alfred Thalmann

== Results ==
Legend

Win Draw Loss

=== Friendly matches ===
==== Pre-season ====
1 September 1907 Pre-season	La Chaux-de-Fonds	7–5	Basel	Parc des Sports, La Chaux-de-Fonds
14:30	Goal	Summary	Goal	Attendance: 500

8 September 1907 Pre-season	Freiburger FC	5–3	Basel	Freiburg im Breisgau
	Goal	Summary	Goal

22 September 1907 Pre-season	FC Frankonia 1900 Strassburg	0–10	Basel	Strassburg
		Summary	(0:1) (0:2) (0:3) (0:4) (0:5) (0:6) (0:7) (0:8) (0:9) (0:10)

==== Winter break ====
1 December 1907 Winter break	Basel	3–2	Strassburger FV	Landhof, Basel
15:00	Goal	Summary	Goal

8 December 1907 Winter break	Servette	5–1	Basel	Parc des Sports, Geneva
	Goal	Summary	Goal

24 December 1907 Winter break	Mannheimer FG 1896	0–2	Basel	Mannheim
		Summary	(0:1) (0:2)

26 December 1907 Winter break	1. Hanauer FC 1893	1–0	Basel	Hanau
	(1:0)	Summary

=== Serie A ===
==== East group results ====
6 October 1907 Round 1	St. Gallen	3–5	Basel	Eisbahnfeld, St. Fiden
	Schwendener II 20' (1:1); Herzog (2:1); Locatelli (3:3)	Summary	(1:0) Thalmann; 55' (2:2) Pfeiffer (2:3) Stöhrmann (3:4) Senn (3:5) Pfeiffer	Referee: (Switzerland) Landolt (Grasshopper-Club Zürich)

13 October 1907 Round 2	Basel	6–0	Young Fellows Zürich	Landhof, Basel
15:00	Thalmann 10' (pen.), 1:0'; Stöhrmann (2:0); Senn 60' (3:0); Senn 64' (4:0); Pfeiffer (5:0); Senn (6:0)	Summary		Referee: (Switzerland) Schwab (FC Young Boys Bern)

20 October 1907 Round 3	Winterthur	3–1	Basel	Winterthur
	(o.g. 1:0) (2:0) (3:0)	Summary	(3:1)	Referee: (Switzerland) Tschudy (FC Blue Stars Zürich)

27 October 1907 Round 4	Basel	3–3	Old Boys	Landhof, Basel
	Pfeiffer (1:0); Thalmann (penalty missed); Pfeiffer (2:1); Senn (3:3)	Summary	(o.g. 1:1) Persenico (pen. 2:2) Hopf (2:3) Niggli	Referee: (Switzerland) Lalive (FC La Chaux-de-Fonds)

3 November 1907 Round 5	Basel	3–4	Grasshopper Club	Landhof, Basel
15:00	Pfeiffer (1:1) (2:3) Stöhrmann (3:4) Stöhrmann	Summary	(0:1) Schmidt II (1:2) Sutz; 40' (1:3) Sutz (2:4) Sutz	Referee: (Switzerland)

10 November 1907 Round 6	Zürich	5–3	Basel	Zürich
14:30	Hinnen (1:0); Staub (2:0); Schlegel (3:0); Weilenmann (4:2); Staub (5:3)	Summary	(3:1) (3:2) (4:3)	Referee: (Switzerland) Arbenz (Grasshopper-Club Zürich)

17 November 1907 Round 7	Basel	6–5	Aarau	Landhof, Basel
15:00	Hasler; Pfeiffer; Stöhrmann	[ Summary]	Goal	Attendance: 300; Referee: (Switzerland) A. Blades

15 March 1908 Round 8	Basel	4–2	Zürich	Landhof, Basel
15:00	Senn (1:2); Pfeiffer 70' (2:2); Pfeiffer (3:2); Senn (4:2)	Summary	(0:1) (o.g. 0:2)	Referee: (Switzerland) Max Schwab (FC Young Boys Bern)

22 March 1908 Round 9	Young Fellows Zürich	1–1	Basel	Zürich
	Goal	Summary	Goal	Referee: (Switzerland) H. Tschudy (FC Blue Stars Zürich)

29 March 1908 Round 10	Old Boys	0–1	Basel	Basel
15:30		Summary	24' (o.g. 0:1) Zoller	Referee: (Switzerland) Hr. Schupp (FC Old Boys Basel)

12 April 1908 Round 11	Basel	1–2	St. Gallen	Landhof, Basel
15:00	Goal	Summary	Goal	Referee: (Switzerland) Max Schwab (FC Young Boys Bern)

3 May 1908 Round 12	Aarau	6–2	Basel	Aarau
14:30	(1:0) (2:0) (3:1) (4:2) (5:2) (6:2)	Summary	(2:1) (3:2)	Referee: (Switzerland) Kratz ( FC Zürich)

10 May 1908 Round 13	Grasshopper Club	1–3	Basel	Zürich
	Goal	Summary	Goal	Referee: (Switzerland) Max Schwab (FC Young Boys Bern)

24 May 1908 Round 14	Basel	1–4	Winterthur	Landhof, Basel
15:00	Goal	Summary	Goal	Referee: (Switzerland) F. Seiffert (FC Old Boys Basel)

==== East group league table ====
Pos	Team	Pld	W	D	L	GF	GA	GD	Pts	Qualification
1	FC Winterthur	14	10	2	2	47	22	+25	22	Advance to finals
2	Old Boys Basel	14	7	2	5	33	29	+4	16	
3	FC Basel	14	6	2	6	40	39	+1	14	
4	Grasshopper Club Zürich	14	6	1	7	38	40	−2	13	
5	FC Zürich	14	6	1	7	36	39	−3	13	
6	Young Fellows Zürich	14	5	3	6	31	46	−15	13	
7	FC St. Gallen	14	4	3	7	32	38	−6	11	
8	FC Aarau	14	5	0	9	39	43	−4	10	

Source: rsssf

== See also ==
- History of FC Basel
- List of FC Basel players
- List of FC Basel seasons

== Sources ==
- Rotblau: Jahrbuch Saison 2014/2015. Publisher: FC Basel Marketing AG. ISBN 978-3-7245-2027-6
- Die ersten 125 Jahre. Publisher: Josef Zindel im Friedrich Reinhardt Verlag, Basel. ISBN 978-3-7245-2305-5
- Switzerland 1907-08 at RSSSF
- FCB team 1907-08 at fcb-archiv.ch
