= 1906–07 FC Basel season =

FC Basel
1906–07 season
- Chairman: Ernst-Alfred Thalmann
- First team coach: Daniel Hug (as team captain)
- Ground: Landhof, Basel
- Serie A: Group Stage: winners Finals: third
- Top goalscorer: n/a (Note: The player lines-ups and goal scorers for 4 of the 8 league games in the 1906–07 season are unknown or incomplete.)
- Average home league attendance: n/a

The FC Basel 1906–07 season was their fourteenth season in their existence. The club's chairman was Ernst-Alfred Thalmann, who was chairman for the fourth consecutive year. FC Basel played their home games in the Landhof.

== Overview ==
Daniel Hug was team captain for the second season in a row. Hug was Basel's most prominent and their largest player and as captain he led the team trainings and was responsible for the line-ups. Basel played five pre-season friendlies, two against German team Freiburger FC, two against German team Karlsruher FV and one against Swiss team Grasshopper Club. Four of these games ended with a defeat, only one ended in a victory. During the first half of the season they played another two friendlies, again one against the Grasshoppers and one against Montriond Lausanne. During the winter break the team travelled to Frankfurt and played against FC Hermannia on Christmas day and against FSV Frankfurt on boxing day. Further winter break friendlies were played away against Freiburger FC and at home in the Landhof against Cantonal Neuchâtel. After the season Basel played two friendly games against Winterthur, who had been runners-up in the east group. The team then travelled to Italy and won both friendlies against AC Milan on Easter Sunday 31 March and Easter Monday 1 April by four goals to three.

The Swiss Serie A season 1906–07 was divided into three regional groups, east, central and west. Together with Young Boys, FC Bern, Aarau and the Old Boys, Basel were allocated to the central group. Basel played their first four games away, losing the consecutive games against Young Boys and Old Boys both 3–4. However, winning the next four consecutive games they climbed the table. As it came to the last group game of the season, at home against the Old Boys, Basel were leading the table two points ahead of their opponents. However, in this last match despite a two-goal lead, the goals being scored by Dr. Siegfried Pfeiffer and Max Senn, their local rivals turned the game and won three goals to two.

Subsequently it came to a play-off to see who would advance to the finals. The play-off match was interrupted in the 50th minute due to a storm and following the restart it ended in a 1–1 draw. Thus, it required a reply one week later and this was also drawn 1–1. They played 2x 10 minutes extra time, but neither team scored. Therefore, both teams agreed to play a further 15 minutes, but neither team scored. Another week later it then came to a second replay which Basel decided with 4–1 for themselves.

Basel advanced to the finals for the first time in their history. The final was played as a round robin tournament. In the first match they were beaten 1–5 by west group winners Servette and in the second 2–3 by Young Fellows Zürich. Servette won the deciding match and became Swiss champions for the first time in the clubs history.

== Players ==
Squad members

Note: Flags indicate national team as defined under FIFA eligibility rules; some limited exceptions apply. Players may hold more than one non-FIFA nationality.

No.	Pos.	Nation	Player
—	GK		Pierre Chevalley
—	GK	SUI	Jules Fingerlin
—	MF	SUI	Daniel Hug
—	DF	SUI	Adolf Ramseyer
—	MF	GER	Josef Goldschmidt
—	MF	SUI	Emil Hasler
—	MF	SUI	Max Palatini
—	MF	SUI	Luigi Persenico
—	MF	SUI	Eugen Strauss
—	MF		P. Vaney
—	FW		John André
—	FW		Manuel Bourgeois

No.	Pos.	Nation	Player
—	FW	SUI	Karl Gossweiler
—	FW		? Kunz
—	FW	SUI	Dr. Siegfried Pfeiffer
—	FW		? Robert
—	FW	SUI	Max Senn
—	FW	GER	Alfred Stöhrmann
—	FW	SUI	Ernst-Alfred Thalmann
—			Edmond Bédat
—			Carl Bitz
—			? Coco
—			? Maun
—			Ernesto Persenico
—			Arthur Viehoff

== Results ==
=== Legend ===
Win Draw Loss

=== Friendly matches ===
==== Pre- and mid-season ====
5 August 1906 Pre-season	Freiburger FC	4–9	Basel	Freiburg, Baden-Württemberg
	Goal	Summary	Goal

9 September 1906 Pre-season	Karlsruher FV	5–3	Basel	Karlsruhe
	Goal	Summary	Goal

23 September 1906 Pre-season	Basel	0–3	Freiburger FC	Landhof, Basel
		Summary	(0:1) (0:2) (0:3)	Attendance: 600

30 March 1906 Pre-season	Basel	2–8	Karlsruher FV	Landhof, Basel
	Goal	Summary	Goal

14 October 1906 Pre-season	Grasshopper Club	1–2	Basel	Zürich
	(1:1)	Summary	20' (0:1) Senn (1:2) Senn

25 November 1906 Mid-season	Basel	4–3	Grasshopper Club	Landhof, Basel
	Pfeiffer (1:1) (2:1) (3:1); Gossweiler (4:2)	Summary	(pen. 0:1) Bauer (3:2) Ochsenbein (4:3) Mory	Attendance: 600

2 December 1906 Mid-season	Basel	2–3	Montriond Lausanne	Landhof, Basel
	Pfeiffer (1:2); Hug (2:2)	Summary	(0:1) (0:2) (2:3) Bossard	Referee: (Switzerland) Kupferschmid (FC Old Boys Basel)

==== Winter break to end of season ====
25 December 1906 Winter break	FC Hermannia Frankfurt	2–3	Basel	Sportplatz am Röderberg, Frankfurt
	17' (pen. 1:1) (2:3)	Summary	15' (0:1) Zigerli; 57' (1:2) Zigerli; 63' (1:3) Hug
Note: Basel without Siegfried Pfeiffer, Karl Gossweiler and Manuel Bourgeois, but with Zigerli (Young Boys) and players from the reserve team.

26 December 1906 Winter break	FSV Frankfurt	3–5	Basel	Frankfurt
	Goal	Summary	Goal
Note: Basel without Siegfried Pfeiffer, Karl Gossweiler and Manuel Bourgeois, but with Zigerli (Young Boys) and players from the reserve team. Due to the snow fall the game was played 2x 35 Minutes

6 January 1907 Winter break	Freiburger FC	5–3	Basel	Freiburg
	Lichtenberg (1:1); Glaser (2:2); H. Bodenweber (3:3); Hunn (4:3) (5:3)	Summary	(0:1) (1:2) (2:3) Pfeiffer

20 January 1907 Winter break	Basel	7–1	Cantonal Neuchâtel	Landhof, Basel
15:00	Goal	Summary	Goal

3 March 1907 Mid-season	Basel	3–4	La Chaux-de-Fonds	Landhof, Basel
	Senn (1:0); Gossweiler (2:0) (pen. 3:2)	Summary	(2:1) (2:2) (3:3) (3:4)	Referee: Ebinger, (FC Basel)

17 March 1907 End of season	Basel	3–2	Winterthur	Landhof, Basel
15:00	Pfeiffer (1:0); Strauss (2:0); Stöhrmann (3:0)	Summary	(3:1) (3:2)	Referee: Seiffert, (Old Boys)

24 March 1907 End of season	Winterthur	3–3	Basel	Schützenwiese, Winterthur
	Jules Fingerlin (o.g. 1:0); Frauenfelder (2:0); Hohmann (3:2)	Summary	(2:1) Stöhrmann (2:2) Pfeiffer; (penalty missed) Gossweiler (3:3)

31 March 1907 End of season	AC Milan	3–4	Basel	Milan
	Widmer (pen. 1:0) (2:0) (3:1)	Summary	(pen. 2:1) Pfeiffer (3:2) (3:3) (3:4)	Referee: Suter

1 April 1907 End of season	AC Milan	3–4	Basel	Milan
	Chilpin (1:2) (3:3)	Summary	(0:1) Pfeiffer (0:2) Thalmann (3:4) Stöhrmann; (penalty missed) Pfeiffer	Referee: Suter

19 May 1907 End of season	Basel	3–0	Combined team, medical recruits	Landhof, Basel
	(1:0) (2:0) (3:0)	Summary
Note: To make things fairer, the football team played in a completely different line-up as usual, all defenders played as forwards and vice versa.

=== Serie A ===
The Serie A was divided into three regional groups, east, central and west. The winners of each group played a final round robin.

==== Central group results ====
28 October 1906 Round 1	FC Bern	2–6	Basel	Kirchenfeld, Bern
14:30	(1:3) (2:3)	Summary	(0:1) (0:2) (0:3) (2:4) (2:5) (2:6)	Referee: (Switzerland) Bleuler (GC)

4 November 1906 Round 2	Young Boys	4–3	Basel	Bern
	Goal	Summary	Goal

11 November 1906 Round 3	Old Boys	4–3	Basel	Margarethenwiese, Basel
15:00	Goal	Summary	Goal

18 November 1906 Round 4	Aarau	1–2	Basel	Aarau
14:50	30' (1:0)	Summary	67' (1:1) Gossweiler (1:2) Senn	Referee: (Switzerland) Bleuler (GC)

9 December 1906 Round 5	Basel	3–0	FC Bern	Landhof, Basel
	Hug (1:0); Gossweiler (2:0); Gossweiler 75' (3:0)	Summary		Referee: (Switzerland) Bleuler (GC)

16 December 1906 Round 6	Basel	4–2	Young Boys	Landhof, Basel
15:00	Goal	Summary	Goal	Referee: (Switzerland) Bleuler (GC)

24 February 1907 Round 7	Basel	7–4	Aarau	Landhof, Basel
	Goal	Summary	Goal

10 March 1907 Round 8	Basel	2–3	Old Boys	Landhof, Basel
15:00	Pfeiffer (1:0); Senn (2:0)	Summary	(1:2) Rink (2:2) Lotter (2:3) Rietmann	Referee: (Switzerland) René Meier (FC Blue Stars Zürich)

==== Play-off ====
1st play-off

7 April 1907	Old Boys Basel	1–1	Basel	Margarethenwiese, Basel
15:00	Kaltenbach 47' (1:0)	Summary	86' (1:1) Pfeiffer	Referee: (Switzerland) Landolt (Grasshopper-Club Zürich)

2nd play-off

14 April 1907	Old Boys Basel	1–1 (a.e.t.)	Basel	Margarethenwiese, Basel
15:00	Laube 70' (1:1)	Summary	60' (0:1) Gossweiler	Attendance: 1,200; Referee: (Switzerland) Eicher
Note: Extra time was agreed between the teams as 2x 10 Minutes and then a further 15 Minutes were also added.

3rd play-off

21 April 1907	Old Boys Basel	1–4	Basel	Margarethenwiese, Basel
	? 88' (1:4)	Summary	(0:1) Gossweiler (0:2) Pfeiffer (0:3) Senn; 49' (0:4) ?	Referee: (Switzerland) Lalive (FC La Chaux-de-Fonds)

==== Central group league table ====
Pos	Team	Pld	W	D	L	GF	GA	GD	Pts	Qualification
1	Basel	8	5	0	3	30	20	+10	10	Play-off winners, advance to finals
2	Old Boys	8	5	0	3	20	18	+2	10	Play-offs
3	Young Boys	8	4	0	4	21	17	+4	8	
4	FC Bern	8	4	0	4	16	21	−5	8	
5	Aarau	8	2	0	6	14	25	−11	4	

Source: rsssf

==== Finals ====
The winners of each regional groups, east, central and west played a final round robin.

28 April 1907 Round 1	Servette	5–1	Basel	Spitalacker Bern
14:45	Morier 14' (1:0); Ponse 22' (2:0); Morier 47' (3:0); Frey 66' (4:0); Frey 87' (pen. 5:1)	Summary	81' (4:1) Thalmann	Referee: (Switzerland)

5 May 1907 Round 2	Young Fellows Zürich	3–2	Basel	Kirchenfeld, Bern
15:00	Jenny II 5' (1:0); Hajek 15' (pen. 2:0); Glaser 15'	Summary	60' (3:1) Hasler (pen. 3:2) Strauss	Attendance: 600; Referee: (Switzerland) W. Baehler (FC Young Boys Bern)

==== Final league table ====
Pos	Team	Pld	W	D	L	GF	GA	GD	Pts	Qualification
1	Servette	2	2	0	0	6	1	+5	4	Swiss champions
2	Young Fellows Zürich	2	1	0	1	3	3	0	2	
3	Basel	2	0	0	2	3	8	−5	0	

Source: rsssf

== See also ==
- History of FC Basel
- List of FC Basel players
- List of FC Basel seasons

== Notes ==
=== Footnotes ===
1906–1907 season matches: YB-FCB, OB-FCB, FCB-YB, FCB-Aarau

=== Sources ===
- Rotblau: Jahrbuch Saison 2014/2015. Publisher: FC Basel Marketing AG. ISBN 978-3-7245-2027-6
- Switzerland 1906-07 at RSSSF
- FCB team 1906-07 at fcb-archiv.ch
