= 1901–02 FC Basel season =

FC Basel
1901–02 season
- Chairman: Emanuel Schiess
- First team coach: unknown
- Ground: Thiersteinerallee, Basel
- Serie A: Central group 2nd
- Top goalscorer: n/a (Note: The player lines-ups in one match and goal scorers in three matches of the 7 league games during the 1901–02 season are unknown or incomplete.)
- Average home league attendance: n/a

The FC Basel 1901–02 season was the ninth season in their existence. It was the third season that they played for the Swiss championship in the Series A. The club's chairman was Emanuel Schiess. This was his second period as the club's chairman. In this season Basel played their home games in a new location, next to the Thiersteinerallee, in the Gundeldingen neighborhood in the south-eastern part of the municipality of Basel.

== Overview ==
=== Football ground ===
During the early years of the football sport, an adequate field that could be used as a football pitch was the biggest problem for all clubs. At the very beginning, FC Basel were lucky to find the Landhof, which had just been taken over by Katharina Ehrler-Wittich from the inheritors of Andreas Merian-Iselin, a member of the Merian family. Straight after the club's foundation, she made the Landhof available, free of charge for the first few years, as a playing surface. From 1895 to 1901, the Vélodrome de Bâle, a cycle track, was also located around the grounds. As the Vélodrome club dissolved a new tenant was found and at the start of the 1901–02 season a new football ground had to be found, because the new tenants had built a concrete bowling lane right across the middle of the football pitch.

The club tried and tested the FC Excelsior grounds and the sports grounds next to St. Paul's Church, but to no avail. They eventually found a space in the Thiersteinerallee, right next to the pitch that local rivals BSC Old Boys were using. The Landhof was to the north of the river Rhine and the Thiersteinerallee was about eight kilometers south. The move from the former field to the new field was made late in the evening, the heavy goal posts and crossbars being carried manually across the town in the dark, so that no one would notice that the club was lacking money. This new pitch was used for one and a half years until the concrete bowling alley was eventually removed.

=== Football season ===
Alphonse Schorpp was the team captain for the third successive season and as captain, he led the team training and was responsible for the line-ups. Basel played two pre-season friendlies and two during the mid-season. During the winter break and again at the end of the season the team travelled twice to France to play Mulhouse. Both games ended with a victory. Of the total 11 friendlies that the team played that season seven were won and four ended with a defeat.

Basel played two friendly games against FC Gymnasia 1900, a team that had been newly founded in February 1900 by young players from the upper gymnasium, who united to form a football team. The team was attempting to join the Swiss Football Association. (In January 1904 the club dissolved and merged with Old Boys).

By the end of the previous season 15 clubs with more than 1,000 members had joined the Swiss Football Association. Most of the clubs had two or three teams, therefore the third tier of Swiss football was introduced called Serie C. From a local point of view this meant the following: Serie A with Basel, Old Boys, Fortuna Basel and Excelsior Basel. Serie B with Old Boys II, Basel II and Excelsior Basel II. Serie C with Columbia Basel, Fortuna Basel II, Gymnasia Basel and Nordstern Basel.

The Swiss Serie A season 1901–02 was divided into three regional groups. There were five teams in the east group, five in the central group and four in the west group. Basel were allocated to the central group together with the Young Boys Bern and the afore mentioned three other teams from Basel. Although Fortuna had been relegated the previous season, their reserve team had been Serie B champions and achieved promotion. Excelsior were disqualified from the Serie A by the Swiss Football Association (ASF-SFV) in the mid-season. The reason was that they had illegally poached players from their local rivals, FC Fortuna Basel. The already achieved sporting results were retained in the league table, the missing games were not awarded. FC Basel completed the central division with seven games, five victories and two defeats with ten points, but were one point behind YB who qualified for the finals.

From the west group, FC Bern and the east group, FC Zürich also qualified for the championship play-off. FCZ won the championship.

== Players ==
Note: Flags indicate national team as defined under FIFA eligibility rules; some limited exceptions apply. Players may hold more than one non-FIFA nationality.

No.	Pos.	Nation	Player
—	GK	SUI	Paul Hofer
—	FW	SUI	Emanuel Schiess
—	FW	SUI	Karl Schneider
—	MF	SUI	Ernst-Alfred Thalmann (Thalmann I)
—	FW	SUI	Rudolf Gossweiler
—	FW	SUI	Emil Hasler
—	FW	SUI	Daniel Hug
—	FW	SUI	Rudolf Landerer
—	FW	SUI	Dr. Siegfried Pfeiffer
—	FW	SUI	Hans Riggenbach (Riggenbach II)
—			? Clarasso

No.	Pos.	Nation	Player
—		ENG	Archibald E. Gough
—		SUI	Eduard Laubi
—		SUI	P. Lozéron
—		SUI	Paul Nosch
—		SUI	Adolf Ramseyer
—		SUI	Hans Rietmann
—		SUI	Alphonse Schorpp
—		SUI	Eugen Stutz (Stutz I)
—		SUI	Werner Stutz (Stutz II)
—		SUI	Fritz Schweizer
—		SUI	Paul Thalmann (Thalmann III)

== Results ==
Legend

Win Draw Loss Forfait

=== Friendly matches ===
==== Pre-and mid-season ====
29 September 1901 Pre-season	Basel	5 – 1	FC Neuchâtel	FC Excelsior grounds, Basel
14:45	(1:0) (2:0) (3:0) (4:0) (5:0)	Summary	(5:1)	Referee: M. Bächlin, BSC Old Boys

13 October 1901 Pre-season	Grasshopper Club	2 – 1	Basel	Zürich
10:00	(1:0) (2:1)	Summary	(1:1)

10 November 1901 Mid-season	Basel	1 – 4	La Chaux-de-Fonds	Sport ground next to St. Paul's Church, Basel
14:30	(1:1)	Summary	(0:1) (1:2) (1:3) (1:4)	Referee: H. Gautschy, FC Old Boys

22 November 1901 Mid-season	Basel	2 – 1	Mulhouse	Thiersteinerallee, Basel
15:300	Goal	Summary	Goal

==== Winter break to end of season ====
19 January 1902 Winter break	Basel	1 – 3	Grasshopper Club	Thiersteinerallee, Basel
16:00	Hug (1:3)	Summary	(0:1) Hotz (0:2) Delaquis (0:3) Hotz	Referee: Emanuel Schiess, FC Basel
Note: Playing time 2x 30 minutes

26 January 1902 Winter break	Mulhouse	1 – 3	Basel	Mulhouse
	Goal	Summary	Goal

16 March 1902 End of season	Basel	10 – 0	FC Gymnasia	Thiersteinerallee, Basel
	(1:0) (2:0) (3:0) (4:0) (5:0) (6:0) (7:0) (8:0) (9:0) (10:0)	Summary

30 March 1902 End of season	Servette	1 – 3	Basel	Geneva
	Goal	Summary	Goal

31 March 1902 End of season	FC Neuchâtel	2 – 1	Basel	Yverdon
	Goal	Summary	Goal

13 April 1902 End of season	Basel	8 – 0	FC Gymnasia	Thiersteinerallee, Basel
	(1:0) (2:0) (3:0) (4:0) (5:0) (6:0) (7:0) (8:0)	Summary

11 May 1902 End of season	Mulhouse	1 – 4	Basel	Mulhouse
	Goal	Summary	Gossweiler I Thalmann I Landerer; Hasler	Attendance: 3,000

=== Serie A ===
==== Central group matches ====
20 October 1901 Round 1	Old Boys	2 – 0	Basel	Thiersteinerallee, Basel
14:30	Grauwyler (I) (1:0); Gonzer (2:0)	Summary		Referee: (Switzerland) E. Küenzli, FC Fortuna Basel

3 November 1901 Round 2	FC Fortuna Basel	1 – 4	Basel	Sport ground next to St. Paul's Church, Basel
15:00	(1:3)	Summary	(0:1) Landerer (0:2) Landerer (0:3) Thalmann I (1:4) Laubi	Attendance: 1,500; Referee: (Switzerland) C. Trueb, FC Old Boys

17 November 1901 Round 3	Young Boys	2 – 0	Basel	Schwellenmätteli, Bern
	(1:0) (2:0)	Summary		Referee: (Switzerland) A. Lalive, FC La Chaux-de-Fonds

24 November 1901 Round 4	Excelsior Basel	0 – 3	Basel	Thiersteinerallee, Basel
		Summary	(0:1) (0:2) (0:3)
Note: FCB played with 10 players. Excelsior played two games on the same day, they started the game with 8 players and a ninth came during the game.

Round 5	Basel	P – P	Excelsior Basel	Thiersteinerallee, Basel
		Summary

2 February 1902 Round 6	Basel	3 – 1	Old Boys	Thiersteinerallee, Basel
15:00	(1:0) (2:1) (3:1)	Summary	(1:1)	Referee: (Switzerland) R. Westermann, Grasshopper Club Zürich

9 February 1902 Round 7	Basel	3 – 1	FC Fortuna Basel	Thiersteinerallee, Basel
	(1:0) (2:0) (3:0)	Summary	(3:1) Seibert	Referee: (Switzerland) H. Gautschy, Old Boys

2 March 1902 Round 8	Basel	4 – 2	Young Boys	Thiersteinerallee, Basel
	Landerer (1:0); Schiess (2:0); Schiess (3:2); Hug (4:2)	Summary	(2:1) Lloyd (2:2) Lloyd	Referee: (Switzerland) Loos, Old Boys

==== Group central league table ====
Pos	Team	Pld	W	D	L	GF	GA	GD	Pts	Qualification
1	Young Boys	7	5	1	1	26	8	+18	11	Advance to finals
2	Basel	7	5	0	2	15	7	+8	10	
3	Old Boys	7	4	1	2	27	6	+21	9	
4	Fortuna Basel	7	1	0	6	12	31	−19	2	
5	Excelsior Basel	4	0	0	4	1	29	−28	0	Disqualified and relegated

Source: RSSSF

== See also ==
- History of FC Basel
- List of FC Basel players
- List of FC Basel seasons

== Notes ==
=== Footnotes ===
Incomplete league matches 1901–1902 season: FCB-OB, Excelsior-FCB, FCB-Fortuna

=== Sources ===
- Rotblau: Jahrbuch Saison 2014/2015. Publisher: FC Basel Marketing AG. ISBN 978-3-7245-2027-6
- Die ersten 125 Jahre. Publisher: Josef Zindel im Friedrich Reinhardt Verlag, Basel. ISBN 978-3-7245-2305-5
- Switzerland 1901-02 at RSSSF

(NB: Despite all efforts, the editors of these books and the authors in "Basler Fussballarchiv" have failed to be able to identify all the players, their date and place of birth or date and place of death, who played in the games during the early years of FC Basel. Most of the documentation for this season is missing.)
