= 1911–12 FC Basel season =

FC Basel
1911–12 season
- Chairman: Ernst-Alfred Thalmann
- First team coach: Emil Hasler (as team captain)
- Ground: Landhof, Basel
- Serie A: Group Stage: Fifth
- Top goalscorer: n/a (Note: The player lines-ups and goal scorers for 6 of the 14 league games in the 1911–12 season are unknown or incomplete.)
- Average home league attendance: n/a

The FC Basel 1911–12 season was their nineteenth season since the club's foundation. The club's chairman was Ernst-Alfred Thalmann, it was his tenth presidential term altogether and his fourth in succession. FC Basel played their home games in the Landhof in the district Basel-Wettstein in Kleinbasel, Basel.

== Overview ==
During the 1911–12 season Emil Hasler was the team captain for the fourth consequtive season and as captain he led the team trainings and was responsible for the line-ups. Basel played a total of 37 matches, 23 friendly games and 14 in the domestic league. Of the friendlies five of the games were played abroad and of the home games five were hosted against foreign clubs. Seven were played against German teams. On 27 August 1911 Basel hosted their first German opponent and this game against FV Baden-Baden was won 7–1. The other three pre-season matches were also won and all three against Swiss teams. During the winter break the team travelled to Italy. On Christmas Eve they were beaten 1–0 by Genoa and on Boxing day they played a 5–5 draw with SG Andrea Doria. At the end of the season the team made a short tour to Germany and played games against Kickers Offenbach and Karlsruher FC Phönix. Basel also hosted French team Mulhouse. Of these 23 friendlies 10 were won, 3 were drawn and 10 were defeats.

The Swiss Serie A 1911–12 was divided into three regional groups. Eight teams in the east group, eight in the central and seven in the east group. Basel were allocated to the central group together with local rivals Old Boys and newly promoted Nordstern Basel. The other teams playing in the Central group were Biel-Bienne, FC Bern, Young Boys, FC La Chaux-de-Fonds and Étoile-Sporting (La Chaux-de-Fonds). Basel started the season badly, losing three of their first four matches and they ended it badly, losing four of their last six games. During the season Basel won five league matches, drew two, but lost seven, scoring a total of 30 goals and conceding 34. Étoile-Sporting won the group and qualified for the finals. Aarau became Swiss champions.

== Players ==
Squad members

Note: Flags indicate national team as defined under FIFA eligibility rules; some limited exceptions apply. Players may hold more than one non-FIFA nationality.

No.	Pos.	Nation	Player
—	GK		K. Sandmann
—	GK	(Switzerland) SUI	Fridolin Wenger
—	GK		A.H. Würgler
—	MF	(Switzerland) SUI	Fritz Albicker (II)
—	MF	(Switzerland) SUI	Wilhelm Geisser
—	MF	(Germany) GER	Josef Goldschmidt
—	MF	(Switzerland) SUI	Emil Hasler
—	MF	(Switzerland) SUI	Ernst Kaltenbach
—	MF	(Switzerland) SUI	Jakob Känzig
—	MF	(Switzerland) SUI	Otto Kuhn
—	MF	(Switzerland) SUI	Max Palatini
—	FW	(Switzerland) SUI	Christian Albicker (I)
—	FW	(Switzerland) SUI	Rudolf Bredschneider
—	FW		E. Friedli
—	FW	(Switzerland) SUI	Karl Ibach

No.	Pos.	Nation	Player
—	FW	(Sweden) SWE	Birger Persson
—	FW	(Switzerland) SUI	Karl Wunderle
—			Max Bauer
—	FW	(Switzerland) SUI	Ernst Buss
—			Hans Enzmann
—		(Switzerland) SUI	? Gossweiler
—			? Gürtler
—	MF	(Switzerland) SUI	Max Mayer
—			? Keller
—			? Kuhn
—			Ernst Kuhn
—			? Kuhn (II)
—			? Levy
—			? Riesterer
—			? Ruprecht
—			? Scherrer

== Results ==
Legend

Win Draw Loss

=== Friendly matches ===
==== Pre- and mid season ====
27 August 1911 Pre-season	Basel	7–1	FV Baden-Baden	Landhof, Basel
15:00	Goal	Summary	Goal

3 September 1911 Pre-season	Basel	2–1	SC Brühl St. Gallen	Landhof, Basel
15:00	Goal	Summary	Goal

10 September 1911 Pre-season	St. Gallen	1–2	Basel	St. Gallen
	(1:0)	Summary	(1:1) (2:1)	Attendance: 1,200

24 September 1911 Pre-season	Old Boys	1–0	Basel	Landhof, Basel
15:30	Goldschmidt (1:0)	Summary		Referee: Ehret, Freiburger FC

12 November 1911 Mid-season	Grasshopper Club	3–4	Basel	Zürich
	Goal	Summary	Goal

==== Winter break to end of season ====
10 December 1911 Winter break	Basel	1–2	St. Gallen	Landhof, Basel
15:00	Friedli (1:2)	Summary	(0:1) (0:2) Jörg	Referee: Ramseyer

17 December 1911 Winter break	Basel	4–3	Freiburger FC	Landhof, Basel
	Albicker (1:2); Albicker (2:2) (3:2) (4:2)	Summary	(0:1); 5' (0:2) (4:3)	Referee: Ramseyer

24 December 1911 Winter break	Genoa	1–0	Basel	Genoa
	(1:0)	Summary

26 December 1911 Winter break	SG Andrea Doria	5–5	Basel	Genoa
	(1:0) (3:4) (4:4) (5:5)	Summary	(2:4) (4:5)

31 December 1911 Winter break	Basel	2–3	Würzburger Kickers	Landhof, Basel
15:00	Buss (1:2); 2:3'	Summary	(0:1) (0:2) (o.g. 1:3)

1 January 1912 Winter break	Basel	2–2	FV 1900 Kaiserslautern	Landhof, Basel
15:00	Friedli (1:0) (2:1)	Summary	(1:1) (2:2)	Referee: Ramseyer

11 February 1912 Mid-season	Young Boys	7–0	Basel	Bern
	(1:0) (2:0) (3:0) (4:0) (5:0) (6:0) (7:0)	Summary

18 February 1912 Mid-season	Basel	2–0	Mulhouse	Landhof, Basel
15:00	(1:0) (2:0)	Summary

3 March 1912 Mid-season	Freiburger FC	6–0	Basel	Freiburg im Breisgau
	Glaser (1:0) (2:0) (3:0) (4:0) (5:0); Hensler (6:0)	Summary		Referee: J. Kaiser
Note: The goals from 2:0 to 5:0 were scored by Mechling (2), Steiert and Rudolf but the sequence is unknown

10 March 1912 Mid-season	Montriond Lausanne	4–0	Basel	Olympique de la Pontaise, Lausanne
14:30	(1:0) (2:0) (3:0) (4:0)	Summary

21 April 1912 End of season	Servette	0–2	Basel	Charmilles Stadium, Geneva
14:30		Summary	(0:1) Albicker (0:2) Albicker

28 April 1912 End of season	Young Fellows Zürich	2–2	Basel	Zürich
	Kienast (1:2); Bonner (2:2)	Summary	(0:1) (0:2)

5 May 1912 End of season	Basel	4–2	Baden	Landhof, Basel
15:00	Goal	summary	Goal

12 May 1912 End of season	Basel	3–1	Aarau	Landhof, Basel
15:00	Wunderle (1:0); Bredschneider (2:1); Kaltenbach (3:1)	Summary	(1:1)

19 May 1912 End of season	St. Gallen	2–1	Basel	St. Gallen
	Goal	Summary	Goal

26 May 1912 End of season	Kickers Offenbach	5–0	Basel	Offenbach am Main
	(1:0) (2:0) (3:0) (4:0) (5:0)	Summary

27 May 1912 End of season	Karlsruher FC Phönix	7–2	Basel	Karlsruhe
	Goal	Summary	Goal

2 June 1912 End of season	Old Boys	2–1	Basel	Margarethenwiese, Basel
15:00	Goal	Summary	Goal

=== Serie A ===
==== Central group results ====
8 October 1911 Round 1	Basel	0–2	Nordstern Basel	Landhof, Basel
15:00		Summary	Goal

15 October 1911 Round 2	FC La Chaux-de-Fonds	6–2	Basel	Parc des Sports, La Chaux-de-Fonds
14:30	Goal	Summary	Goal

22 October 1911 Round 3	Old Boys	4–4	Basel	Margarethenwiese, Basel
15:00	(1:1) (2:2) (pen. 3:3) (4:4)	Summary	(1:0) Albicker (1:2) (2:3) Albicker (3:4) Goldschmidt	Referee: (Switzerland) Sporrer, Winterthur

5 November 1911 Round 4	Étoile-Sporting	4–1	Basel	Parc de l'Etoile, La Chaux-de-Fonds
14:30	Goal	Summary	Goal

19 November 1911 Round 5	Biel-Bienne	2–2	Basel	Biel-Bienne
	Goal	[ Summary]	Goal	Referee: (Switzerland) W. Lehmann

26 November 1911 Round 6	Basel	3–0 FF	Young Boys	Landhof, Basel
15:00	Friedli (1:2)	Summary	(0:1) Kientsch (0:2) (1:3) (o.g. 1:4)
Note: The game was rated 3: 0 forfait because the Young Boys had used an unqualified player.

3 December 1911 Round 7	Basel	6–0	FC Bern	Landhof, Basel
15:00	Goal	Summary		Referee: (Switzerland) Jacques Reich, Winterthur
Note: Bern played with just 10 players

7 January 1912 Round 8	Basel	4–2	Biel-Bienne	Landhof, Basel
15:00	Goal	Summary	Goal

14 January 1912 Round 9	Basel	0–2	Old Boys	Landhof, Basel
15:00		Summary	20' (0:1) Winter; 75' (0:2) Winter	Referee: (Switzerland) Haslebacher, Montriond Lausanne

21 January 1912 Round 10	Nordstern Basel	2–1	Basel	Landhof, Basel
15:30	Bucher (1:0); Rittel (2:1)	Summary	(1:1)	Referee: (Switzerland) Allemann, Zürich

28 January 1912 Round 11	FC Bern	2–1	Basel	Kirchenfeld, Bern
	Baumann (I) 5' (1:0); Beuchat (2:1)	Summary	(1:1) Hasler	Referee: (Switzerland) E. Ammann, Cantonal Neuchatel

25 February 1912 Round 12	Basel	4–1	Étoile-Sporting	Landhof, Basel
15:00	Goal scorers: Hasler (3), Kaltenbach (1)	Summary	Méroz	Referee: (Switzerland) Hinnen, Baden
Note: Goal sequence unknown

17 March 1911 Round 13	Young Boys	6–0	Basel	Bern
	Goal	Summary		Referee: (Switzerland) Hinnen, (FC Baden)

24 March 1912 Round 14	Basel	2– 0	La Chaux-de-Fonds	Landhof, Basel
15:00	Goal	Summary

==== Central group league table ====
Pos	Team	Pld	W	D	L	GF	GA	GD	Pts	Qualification
1	Étoile-Sporting	14	12	0	2	38	19	+19	24	Advance to finals
2	Old Boys	14	11	1	2	45	19	+26	23	
3	La Chaux-de-Fonds	14	9	0	5	53	29	+24	18	
4	Young Boys	14	6	0	8	31	25	+6	12	
5	Basel	14	5	2	7	30	34	−4	12	
6	Nordstern Basel	14	4	2	8	21	36	−15	10	
7	FC Bern	14	4	2	8	21	38	−17	10	
8	Biel-Bienne	14	1	1	12	19	58	−39	3	

Source: rsssf

== See also ==
- History of FC Basel
- List of FC Basel players
- List of FC Basel seasons

== Notes ==
=== Footnotes ===
Incomplete league matches 1911–12 season: FCB-Nordstern, LcdF-FCB, Sporting-FCB, Biel-FCB, FCB-Biel, YB-FCB

=== Sources ===
- Rotblau: Jahrbuch Saison 2014/2015. Publisher: FC Basel Marketing AG. ISBN 978-3-7245-2027-6
- Die ersten 125 Jahre. Publisher: Josef Zindel im Friedrich Reinhardt Verlag, Basel. ISBN 978-3-7245-2305-5
- FCB squad at fcb-archiv.ch.
- Switzerland 1911-12 at RSSSF
