= Manuel Bourgeois =

Swiss footballer

Personal information
- Full name: Manuel Bourgeois
- Date of birth: unknown
- Position: Striker

Senior career*
Years	Team	Apps	(Gls)
1904–1907	FC Basel	8+	(0)
- * Club domestic league appearances and goals

Manuel Bourgeois (date of birth unknown) was a footballer who played as striker on the early 1900s.

== Football career ==
Bourgeois joined FC Basel's first team for their 1904–05 season. He played his first game for the club in the friendly match on 12 February 1905. He scored his first goal for his club in the same game in the Landhof as Basel drew 2–2 with French team Mulhouse.

Bourgeois played his domestic league debut for his club in the 1906–07 Swiss Serie A season in the home game on 9 December 1906 as Basel won 3–0 against FC Bern. In this season Basel and Old Boys ended the central group level on points. As it came to the last group game of the season, at home against the Old Boys, Basel were leading the table two points ahead of their opponents. However, in this last match despite a two-goal lead, the goals being scored by Dr. Siegfried Pfeiffer and Max Senn, their local rivals turned the game and won three goals to two.

Subsequently it came to a play-off to see who would advance to the finals. The play-off match was interrupted in the 50th minute due to a storm and following the restart it ended in a 1–1 draw. Thus, it required a reply one week later and this was also drawn 1–1. The teams played 2x 10 minutes extra time, but neither team scored. Therefore, both teams agreed to play a further 15 minutes, but neither team scored. Another week later it then came to a second replay which Basel decided with 4–1 for themselves. Basel advanced to the finals, but were beaten 1–5 by west group winners Servette and 2–3 by east group winners Young Fellows Zürich. Bourgeois played in all these games. Servette won the deciding match and became Swiss champions.

Bourgeois played for the club for three seasons and played a total of at least 11 games for Basel. (Note: The player lines-ups and goal scorers for 4 of the 6 league games in the 1905–06 season are unknown or incomplete.) (Note: The player lines-ups and goal scorers for 4 of the 8 league games in the 1906–07 season are unknown or incomplete.) Eight of these games were in the Swiss Serie A.

== Noteses ==
=== Footnotes ===
Incomplete league matches 1905–1906 season: FCB-OB, FCB-Bern, YB-FCB, FCB-YB

Incomplete league matches 1906–1907 season: YB-FCB, OB-FCB, FCB-YB, FCB-Aarau

=== Sources ===
- Rotblau: Jahrbuch Saison 2017/2018. Publisher: FC Basel Marketing AG. ISBN 978-3-7245-2189-1
- Die ersten 125 Jahre. Publisher: Josef Zindel im Friedrich Reinhardt Verlag, Basel. ISBN 978-3-7245-2305-5
- Verein "Basler Fussballarchiv" Homepage

(NB: Despite all efforts, the editors of these books and the authors in "Basler Fussballarchiv" have failed to be able to identify all the players, their date and place of birth or date and place of death, who played in the games during the early years of FC Basel. Most documents are missing.)
