= Karl Gossweiler =

Swiss footballer (born 1884)

Personal information
- Full name: Karl Hans Gossweiler
- Date of birth: 23 December 1884
- Place of birth: Switzerland
- Date of death: 24 April 1940
- Position: Striker

Senior career*
Years	Team	Apps	(Gls)
1902–1910	FC Basel	25+	(17)
- * Club domestic league appearances and goals

Karl Gossweiler (23 December 1884 – 24 April 1940) was a Swiss footballer who played as forward in the early 1900s.

== Football career ==
Gossweiler joined FC Basel's first team during their 1902–03 season. He played his first game for the club in the home game on 15 March 1903. He scored his first goal for the club in the same game as Basel won 8–1 against French team FC Mulhouse.

After playing in three test games in his first season, Gossweiler played his domestic league debut for the club in the next season, 1903–04, and this was at the home game in the Landhof on 25 October 1903. He scored his first league goal for his club in the same match as Basel won 3–1 against local rivals FC Fortuna Basel. From this moment on Gossweiler was a regular starter for the team. In their 1904–05 season, in the away game against Weissenbühl Bern in October 1904, Gossweiler scored a hat-trick as Basel won by nine goals to two.

Their 1906–07 season was interesting and it came to following curiosity. As it came to the last group game of the season, at home against the Old Boys, Basel were leading the table two points ahead of their opponents. However, in this last match despite a two-goal lead, the goals being scored by Dr. Siegfried Pfeiffer and Max Senn, their local rivals turned the game and won three goals to two. Subsequently, it came to a play-off to see who would advance to the finals. The play-off match was interrupted in the 50th minute due to a storm and following the restart it ended in a 1–1 draw. Thus, it required a reply one week later and this was also drawn 1–1. Gossweiler scored the first goal of the match and Laube equalised for OB. The teams played 2x 10 minutes extra time, but neither team scored. Therefore, both teams agreed to play a further 15 minutes, but again neither team scored. Another week later it then came to a second replay which Basel decided quite clearly with 4–1 for themselves. Gossweiler scored Basel's first goal in this match as well. Basel advanced to the finals for the first time in their history. The final play-offs were played as a round robin tournament. In the first match they were beaten 1–5 by west group winners Servette and in the second 2–3 by Young Fellows Zürich. Servette won the deciding match and became Swiss champions.

Gossweiler was with the club for eight seasons and during this time he played at least 44 games for Basel scoring at least 23 goals. (Note: The player lines-ups and goal scorers for 3 of the 8 league games in the 1904–05 season are either unknown or are incomplete.) (Note: The player lines-ups and goal scorers for 4 of the 6 league games in the 1905–06 season are either unknown or are incomplete.) (Note: The player lines-ups and goal scorers for 4 of the 8 league games in the 1906–07 season are either unknown or are incomplete.) (Note: The player lines-ups and goal scorers for 10 of the 14 league games in the 1908–09 season are either unknown or are incomplete.) (Note: The player lines-ups and goal scorers for 6 of the 10 league games in the 1909–10 season are either unknown or are incomplete.)

== Notes ==
=== Footnotes ===
Incomplete league matches 1904–1905 season: FCB-Bern, OB-FCB, FCB-YB

Incomplete league matches 1905–1906 season: FCB-OB, FCB-Bern, YB-FCB, FCB-YB

Incomplete league matches 1906–1907 season: YB-FCB, OB-FCB, FCB-YB, FCB-Aarau

Incomplete league matches 1908–1909 season: FCB-YF, FCZ-FCB, FCB-Aarau, FCW-FCB, FCB-FCSG, YF-FCB, FCB-FCB, FCB-OB, GC-FCB, FCSG-FCB

Incomplete league matches 1909–1910 season: YB-FCB, FCB-Biel, Luzern-FCB, Bern-FCB, FCB-YB, Biel-FCB

=== Sources ===
- Rotblau: Jahrbuch Saison 2017/2018. Publisher: FC Basel Marketing AG. ISBN 978-3-7245-2189-1
- Die ersten 125 Jahre. Publisher: Josef Zindel im Friedrich Reinhardt Verlag, Basel. ISBN 978-3-7245-2305-5
- Verein "Basler Fussballarchiv" Homepage

(NB: Despite all efforts, the editors of these books and the authors in "Basler Fussballarchiv" have failed to be able to identify all the players, their date and place of birth or date and place of death, who played in the games during the early years of FC Basel.)
