= Daniel Hug =

Swiss footballer (1884–1918)

Personal information
- Full name: Daniel Hug
- Date of birth: 19 September 1884
- Place of birth: Basel, Switzerland
- Date of death: 28 November 1918 (aged 34)
- Place of death: Trieste, Italy
- Positions: Defender; midfielder

Senior career*
| Years | Team | Apps | (Gls) |
| 1899–1908 | FC Basel | 56 | (8) |
| 1908–1910 | Genoa | | |

International career
| 1908 | Switzerland | 2 | (0) |

Managerial career
- 1909–1910: Genoa
- * Club domestic league appearances and goals

Daniel Hug (17 September 1884 – 28 November 1918) was a Swiss international footballer who played for FC Basel and Genoa C.F.C. He played mainly in the position as defender, but also as midfielder.

== Football career ==
=== Basel ===
In his early years Hug successfully played football for FC Basel and was a member of the Swiss national team. FC Basel was founded on 15 November 1893 and Hug joined Basel's first team some five years later, for their 1899–1900 season. FC Basel did not participate in the second edition of the Swiss championship this season. Hug played his first game for the club in the home game in the Landhof on 4 February 1900 as Basel won 3–1 against FC Fortuna Basel. Hug played in nine of the team's ten friendly games in their spring season.

The following season Basel did, however, compete in the 1900–01 Swiss Serie A and Hug played in eight of the ten league games. Basel's 1900–01 season was a bad season, they ended the group stage in the league in fifth position out of six clubs. A curiosity in this season was the away game on 3 March 1901. This was an away game against Grasshopper Club and it ended in a 3–13 defeat. The reasons for this high defeat can be explained with the fact that one of the players missed the train and that the team played with a number of players from their reserve team. Nevertheless, to date this remains the teams’ highest and biggest defeat in the club’s history.

Hug scored his first league goal for his club on 2 March 1902 in the home game as Basel won 4–2 against Young Boys. During the following seasons Hug played regularly with the team.

In their 1906–07 season Basel played the first four games away from home. The team lost the two consecutive away games against Young Boys and Old Boys both 3–4. These were the only two games that Hug missed in the entire season. However, the team winning the next four consecutive games they climbed to the top of the table. As it came to the last group game of the season, at home the return match against the Old Boys, Basel were leading the table two points ahead of their direct opponents. However in this last match, despite a two-goal lead, the goals being scored by Dr. Siegfried Pfeiffer and Max Senn, their local rivals turned the game and won three goals to two. Subsequently it came to a play-off to see who would advance to the finals. The play-off match was interrupted in the 50th minute due to a storm and following the restart it ended in a 1–1 draw. Thus, it required a reply one week later and this was also drawn 1–1. They played 2x 10 minutes extra time, but neither team scored. Therefore, both teams agreed to play a further 15 minutes, but again neither team scored. Another week later it then came to a second replay which Basel decided quite clearly with 4–1 for themselves. Basel advanced to the finals for the first time in their history. The finals were played as a round robin tournament. In the first match they were beaten 1–5 by west group winners Servette and in the second 2–3 by Young Fellows Zürich. Servette won the deciding match and became Swiss champions for the first time in their club's history.

During their 1907–08 season, Hug was team captain for the third year in succession. He was Basel's most prominent and their largest player and as captain he led the team trainings and was responsible for the line-ups. At the end of the season Hug transferred to Italy, to play professionally for Genoa C.F.C. in the Italian football championship.

Between the years 1899 and 1908 Hug played a total of 92 games (56 in the domestic league, 36 friendly games) for Basel scoring a total of 11 goals. (Note: Scorers: many pre-First World War game sheets no longer exist or are incomplete and so, many line ups and most goal scorers in this period remain unknown.)

=== Genoa ===
In 1908 he moved to Italy to play for Genoa. In the Italian Football Championship 1908 the FIGC agreed to Federal Gymnastics protests forbidding the use of foreign players. Since Genoa's birth they had always had a strong English contingent. They disagreed, as did several other prominent clubs such as Milan, Torino and Firenze; and thus they withdrew from official FIGC competitions that year. The following season the federation reversed the decision and Genoa was rebuilt with players such as Luigi Ferraris and others from Switzerland such as Hug.

=== International ===
Together with goalkeeper Paul Hofer, the players Alphonse Schorpp, Eugen Strauss, Siegfried Pfeiffer, Ernst-Alfred Thalmann und Emil Hasler, Hug was one of many early Swiss national team players who came from the Basel team. Hug wore the Swiss national team shirt twice. His first call up was the friendly match between Switzerland and France on 8 March 1908 in Geneva, which the Swiss lost 1–2. The second call was against Germany, the game played on 5 April 1908. Hugs Basel team mate Pfeiffer scored two goals in the legendary 5–3 victory over Germany at the Landhof in Basel. After his move to Italy he was never called up again.

== Notes ==
=== Sources ===
- Rotblau: Jahrbuch Saison 2017/2018. Publisher: FC Basel Marketing AG. ISBN 978-3-7245-2189-1
- Die ersten 125 Jahre. Publisher: Josef Zindel im Friedrich Reinhardt Verlag, Basel. ISBN 978-3-7245-2305-5
- Verein "Basler Fussballarchiv" Homepage
