= Artur Viehoff =

Swiss footballer (born 1885)

Personal information
- Full name: Artur Viehoff
- Date of birth: 14 December 1885
- Positions: Midfielder; striker

Senior career*
Years	Team	Apps	(Gls)
1901–1907	FC Basel	4+	(0)
- * Club domestic league appearances and goals

Artur Viehoff (born 14 December 1885) was a footballer who played for FC Basel as forward or as midfielder in the early 1900s.

== Football career ==
Viehoff joined Basel's first team during their 1901–02 season. He played his first game for the club in the away friendly game on 26 January 1902 as Basel won 3–1 against FC Mulhouse. He did not play in any league games this season.

Viehoff played his domestic league debut for the club in the home game in the Landhof on 25 October 1903 as Basel won 3–1 against Fortuna Basel. Viehoff became regular player for the team in their 1903–04 season. (Note: The player lines-ups and goal scorers for 2 of the 9 league games in the 1903–04 season are either unknown or are incomplete.)

During the next two season Viehoff played with Basel's second team, who at that time played in the Serie B, the second highest tier of Swiss football.

Viehoff played with the first team again in their 1906–07 season. (Note: The player lines-ups and goal scorers for 4 of the 8 league games in the 1906–07 season are either unknown or are incomplete.) During his time with the first team, Viehoff played in at least six games. Four of these games were in the Series A and two were friendly games.

== Notes ==
=== Footnotes ===
Incomplete league matches 1903–1904 season: Bern-FCB, FCB-OB

Incomplete league matches 1906–1907 season: YB-FCB, OB-FCB, FCB-YB, FCB-Aarau

=== Sources ===
- Rotblau: Jahrbuch Saison 2017/2018. Publisher: FC Basel Marketing AG. ISBN 978-3-7245-2189-1
- Die ersten 125 Jahre. Publisher: Josef Zindel im Friedrich Reinhardt Verlag, Basel. ISBN 978-3-7245-2305-5
- Verein "Basler Fussballarchiv" Homepage
