= Pierre Chevalley =

Swiss footballer

Personal information
- Full name: Pierre Chevalley
- Date of birth: unknown
- Place of birth: Switzerland
- Positions: Goalkeeper; striker

Senior career*
| Years | Team | Apps | (Gls) |
| 1904–1907 | FC Basel | 8+ | (1) |
- * Club domestic league appearances and goals

Pierre Chevalley (date of birth unknown) was a Swiss footballer who played for FC Basel in the early 1900s. He played mainly as goalkeeper, but also as striker, a positional change that was quite normal during that period of time.

== Football career ==
Chevalley joined Basel's first team for their 1904–05 season. He played his domestic league debut for the club as striker in the home game in the Landhof on 16 October 1904 as Basel were defeated 0–5 by Old Boys. During his first season with the team Chevalley played mainly as striker and he scored his first goal for his club on 23 October 1904 in the away game as Basel won 9–2 against FC Weissenbühl Bern. At the end of the 1904–05 Swiss Serie A group stage Basel were in fourth position. (Note: The player lines-ups and goal scorers for 3 of the 8 league games in the 1904–05 season are unknown or incomplete.)

During Basel's 1905–06 season Chevalley played as goalkeeper. The team won two of their six games and they ended the group stage in fourth position. (Note: The player lines-ups and goal scorers for 4 of the 6 league games in the 1905–06 season are unknown or incomplete.) Again in their 1906–07 season he played between the posts. Basel won the central group and advanced to the finals, but were beaten 1–5 by west group winners Servette and 2–3 by east group winners Young Fellows Zürich. Servette won the deciding match and became Swiss champions. (Note: The player lines-ups and goal scorers for 4 of the 8 league games in the 1906–07 season are unknown or incomplete.)

Between the years 1904 and 1907 Chevalley played at least 16 games for Basel scoring at least one goal. At least eight of these games were in the Serie A and eight were friendly games.

== Notes ==
=== Footnotes ===
- 1904–05 season matches: FCB-Bern, OB-FCB, FCB-YB
- 1905–06 season matches: FCB-OB, FCB-Bern, YB-FCB, FCB-YB
- 1906–07 season matches: YB-FCB, OB-FCB, FCB-YB, FCB-Aarau

=== Sources ===
- Rotblau: Jahrbuch Saison 2017/2018. Publisher: FC Basel Marketing AG. ISBN 978-3-7245-2189-1
- Die ersten 125 Jahre. Publisher: Josef Zindel im Friedrich Reinhardt Verlag, Basel. ISBN 978-3-7245-2305-5
- Verein "Basler Fussballarchiv" Homepage

(NB: Despite all efforts, the editors of these books and the authors in "Basler Fussballarchiv" have failed to be able to identify all the players, their date and place of birth or date and place of death, who played in the games during the early years of FC Basel. Most of the documentation is missing.)
