= Eugen Strauss =

Swiss footballer (born 1881)

Personal information
- Full name: Henri Eugen Strauss
- Date of birth: 4 February 1881
- Place of birth: Switzerland
- Position: Midfielder

Senior career*
Years	Team	Apps	(Gls)
1902–1907	FC Basel	22+	(1)
1907–1908	Montriond Lausanne		
1910–1911	La Chaux-de-Fonds		

International career
1907–1908	Switzerland	1	(0)
- * Club domestic league appearances and goals

Henri Eugen Strauss (born 4 February 1881), or Eugène Strauss as he was known in Lausanne, was a Swiss international footballer who played as midfielder in the early 1900s.

== Football career ==
=== Club football ===
Strauss joined FC Basel's first team for their 1902–03 season and in this season he played just one friendly game. In their next season, 1903–04, he played his domestic league debut for the club in the home game in the Landhof on 25 October 1903 as Basel won 3–1 against local rivals FC Fortuna Basel.

During the 1903–04 Swiss Serie A season Strauss advanced to become a regular starter in the Basel team. At the end of the season, Basel were in third position in the group table.

Interesting in Strauss' career was the 1906–07 Swiss Serie A season. In this season Basel and local rivals Old Boys ended the central group level on points. As it came to the last group game of the season, at home against the Old Boys, Basel were leading the table two points ahead of their opponents. However, in this last match despite a two-goal lead, the goals being scored by Dr. Siegfried Pfeiffer and Max Senn, their local rivals turned the game and won three goals to two.

Subsequently it came to a play-off to see who would advance to the finals. The play-off match was interrupted in the 50th minute due to a storm and following the restart it ended in a 1–1 draw. Thus, it required a reply one week later and this was also drawn 1–1. The teams played 2x 10 minutes extra time, but neither team scored. Therefore, both teams agreed to play a further 15 minutes, but neither team scored. Another week later it then came to a second replay which Basel decided with 4–1 for themselves. Basel advanced to the finals, but were beaten 1–5 by west group winners Servette and 2–3 by east group winners Young Fellows Zürich. Servette won the deciding match and became Swiss champions. Strauss played in all these games and he scored his first goal for his club on 5 May 1907 in the last match of the final round against Young Fellows. It was the last goal of the match and scored from a penalty kick.

Between the years 1902 and 1907 Strauss played at least 35 games for Basel and was recorded as scoring two goal. At least 23 of these games were in the Nationalliga A and 12 were friendly games. He probably played more games than mentioned, but the documentation is not available. (Note: The player lines-ups and goal scorers for 3 of the 8 league games in the 1904–05 season are unknown or incomplete.) (Note: The player lines-ups and goal scorers for 4 of the 6 league games in the 1905–06 season are unknown or incomplete.) (Note: The player lines-ups and goal scorers for 4 of the 8 league games in the 1906–07 season are unknown or incomplete.)

Following his time with Basel, Strauss moved on and played at least the 1907–08 Swiss Serie A season with Montriond Lausanne. Lausanne played in the championship west group and ended the season in third position in the group table.

In the Swiss Serie A 1910–11 season Strauss played for La Chaux-de-Fonds.

=== International ===
In the 1907–08 season Strauss was called up for the Swiss national team. On 5 April 1908 he played in the legendary 5–3 victory over Germany at the Landhof in Basel. This was the third national team game for the Swiss and the first for the Germans.

== Notes ==
=== Footnotes ===
Incomplete league matches 1904–1905 season: FCB-Bern, OB-FCB, FCB-YB

Incomplete league matches 1905–1906 season: FCB-OB, FCB-Bern, YB-FCB, FCB-YB

Incomplete league matches 1906–1907 season: YB-FCB, OB-FCB, FCB-YB, FCB-Aarau

=== Sources ===
- Rotblau: Jahrbuch Saison 2017/2018. Publisher: FC Basel Marketing AG. ISBN 978-3-7245-2189-1
- Die ersten 125 Jahre. Publisher: Josef Zindel im Friedrich Reinhardt Verlag, Basel. ISBN 978-3-7245-2305-5
- Verein "Basler Fussballarchiv" Homepage

(NB: Despite all efforts, the editors of these books and the authors in "Basler Fussballarchiv" have failed to be able to identify all the players, their date and place of birth or date and place of death, who played in the games during the early years of FC Basel. Most of the documentation is missing.)
