= Oskar Zwimpfer =

Swiss footballer

Personal information
- Full name: Oskar Zwimpfer
- Date of birth: unknown
- Place of birth: Switzerland
- Position: Midfielder

Senior career*
Years	Team	Apps	(Gls)
1905–1906	FC Basel	2+	(0)
- * Club domestic league appearances and goals

Oskar Zwimpfer (date of birth unknown) was a Swiss footballer who played for as midfielder in the early 1900s.

== Football career ==
Zwimpfer played in FC Basel's reserve team, who at that time played in the second tier of Swiss football. He joined the first team for their 1905–06 season. According to the existing documentation, Zwimpfer played his domestic league debut for the club in the away game on 11 March 1906 as Basel were defeated 0–2 by FC Bern.

In his one season with their first team, Zwimpfer played at least five games for Basel without scoring a goal. At least two of these games were in the Swiss Serie A and the others were friendly games, including a 5–2 away win against AC Milan. He probably played more games than mentioned, but the documentation is not available. (Note: The player lines-ups and goal scorers for 4 of the 6 league games in the 1905–06 season are unknown or incomplete.)

== See also ==
- Football in Switzerland

== Notes ==
Incomplete league matches 1905–1906 season: FCB-OB, FCB-Bern, YB-FCB, FCB-YB

== Sources ==
- Rotblau: Jahrbuch Saison 2017/2018. Publisher: FC Basel Marketing AG. ISBN 978-3-7245-2189-1
- Die ersten 125 Jahre. Publisher: Josef Zindel im Friedrich Reinhardt Verlag, Basel. ISBN 978-3-7245-2305-5
- Verein "Basler Fussballarchiv" Homepage
