= Hans Riggenbach =

Swiss footballer

Personal information
- Full name: Hans Riggenbach
- Date of birth: unknown
- Place of birth: Switzerland
- Position: Defender

Senior career*
Years	Team	Apps	(Gls)
1901–1903	FC Basel	14	(0)
- * Club domestic league appearances and goals

Hans Riggenbach (date of birth unknown) was a Swiss footballer who played as defender in the early 1900s.

Riggenbach joined FC Basel's first team for their 1901–02 season. After playing in two friendly games Riggenbach played his domestic league debut for the club in the away game on 20 October 1901 as Basel were defeated 0–2 by local rivals Old Boys. Riggenbach was a regular starter for the team. At the end of the league group stage, Basel were in second position, one point behind Young Boys who qualified for the finals.

Riggenbach stayed with the team for one more season and again in their 1902–03 season he was a regular starter, in fact he played in all seven league matches. However, in this season things didn't go their way and Basel ended the group stage in third position.

In his two seasons with the team Riggenbach played a total of 26 games for Basel without scoring a goal. 14 of these games were in the Nationalliga A and 12 were friendly games.

== Sources ==
- Rotblau: Jahrbuch Saison 2017/2018. Publisher: FC Basel Marketing AG. ISBN 978-3-7245-2189-1
- Die ersten 125 Jahre. Publisher: Josef Zindel im Friedrich Reinhardt Verlag, Basel. ISBN 978-3-7245-2305-5
- Verein "Basler Fussballarchiv" Homepage

(NB: Despite all efforts, the editors of these books and the authors in "Basler Fussballarchiv" have failed to be able to identify all the players, their date and place of birth or date and place of death, who played in the games during the early years of FC Basel)
