= Alfred Stöhrmann =

German footballer

Personal information
- Full name: Alfred Stöhrmann
- Date of birth: 1882
- Place of birth: Karlsruhe, Germany
- Date of death: 4 September 1914 (aged 31–32)
- Position: Striker

Senior career*
Years	Team	Apps	(Gls)
1904–1907	Phönix Karlsruhe		
1907–1908	FC Basel	7	(5)
- * Club domestic league appearances and goals

Alfred Stöhrmann (1882 – 4 September 1914) was a German footballer who played as striker during the early 1900s.

== Football career ==
Born in and grown up in Karlsruhe, Stöhrmann first played for local club Phönix Karlsruhe from 1904 to 1907.

He joined FC Basel's first team during their 1906–07 season. Stöhrmann played his first for the club in the friendly game on 17 March 1907. He scored his first goal for his new club during the same game as Basel won 3–2 against Winterthur.

After playing in four test games that season, Stöhrmann played his domestic league debut for the club during the first game of the following season. It was on 6 October 1907 and he scored his first league goal in this match as Basel won 5–3 in the away game against St. Gallen.

Stöhrmann stayed one year with the club. He played in a total of 11 games for Basel scoring a total of eight goals. Seven of these games were in the Swiss Serie A and four were friendly games. He scored five goals in the domestic league, the other three were scored during the test games.

== Sources ==
- Die ersten 125 Jahre. Publisher: Josef Zindel im Friedrich Reinhardt Verlag, Basel. ISBN 978-3-7245-2305-5
- Verein "Basler Fussballarchiv" Homepage
