= Luigi Ferraris (footballer) =

Italian association football player (1887-1915)

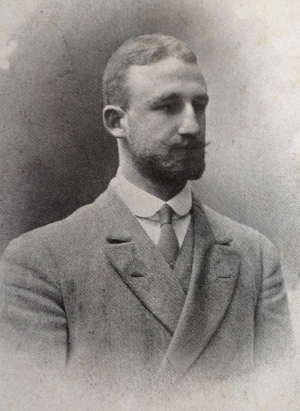
- Luigi Ferraris in 1911

Personal information
- Date of birth: 18 November 1887
- Place of birth: Florence, Kingdom of Italy
- Date of death: 23 August 1915 (aged 27)
- Place of death: Veneto, Kingdom of Italy
- Height: 1.87 m (6 ft 2 in)
- Position: Midfielder

Youth career
- 1902–1903: Genoa

Senior career*
Years	Team	Apps	(Gls)
1904–1906	Genoa II	2	(0)
1907–1911	Genoa	35	(1)
- * Club domestic league appearances and goals

Luigi Ferraris (18 November 1887 – 23 August 1915) was an Italian footballer, engineer and soldier who died during World War I.

== Biography ==
Ferraris was born Florence, while his family hailed from Saluzzo, Piedmont. He joined Genoa in 1902, and played there his entire career, where he won the reserve championship (it) 4–0 against Juventus in 1904.

He studied engineering at the Polytechnic University of Milan from 1906 to 1911. Afterwards, he worked at the Officine Elettriche Genovesi (OEG) in San Fruttuoso, then at Pirelli in Milan.

During the World War I, Ferraris served as a volunteer then reached the rank of lieutenant. On 23 August 1915, he died due to a 152mm shrapnel artillery shell which killed him instantly, during a mission in Val Posina, a minor valley of the Val d'Astico at the municipality of Posina, and was buried by his comrades in arms at Monte Maggio.

In 1933, the stadium, Stadio Luigi Ferraris, was named after him. His Silver Medal of Military Valor was then buried under the "Gradinata Nord" of the stadium, home of the Genoa ultras.
