= Percy Kaufmann =

Swiss footballer

Personal information
- Full name: Percy Kaufmann
- Date of birth: unknown
- Positions: Midfielder; striker

Senior career*
Years	Team	Apps	(Gls)
1902–1905	FC Basel	17+	(1)
- * Club domestic league appearances and goals

Percy Kaufmann (date of birth unknown) was a footballer who played as striker or as midfielder in the early 1900s.

== Football career ==
Kaufmann joined FC Basel's first team for their 1902–03 season. He played his domestic league debut for the club in the home game on 2 November 1902 as Basel were beaten 1–4 by FC Bern. Kaufmann played six of the eight league matches that season and the team finished the group stage in third position in the league table.

Kaufmann was also regular starter in the following two seasons. He scored his first goal for his club on 27 November 1904 in the home game in the Landhof as Basel won 3–0 against Weissenbühl Bern.

During his three seasons with the team, Kaufmann played at least 23 games for Basel scoring two goals. 17 of these games were in the Swiss Series A and six were friendly games. He scored one goal in the domestic league and one was scored during the test games. He probably played in more games than mentioned, but the documentation is incomplete. (Note: The player lines-ups and goal scorers for 2 of the 9 league games in the 1903–04 season are unknown or incomplete.) (Note: The player lines-ups and goal scorers for 3 of the 8 league games in the 1904–05 season are unknown or incomplete.)

== Notes ==
=== Footnotes ===
Incomplete league matches 1903–1904 season: Bern-FCB, FCB-OB

Incomplete league matches 1904–1905 season: FCB-Bern, OB-FCB, FCB-YB

=== Sources ===
- Rotblau: Jahrbuch Saison 2017/2018. Publisher: FC Basel Marketing AG. ISBN 978-3-7245-2189-1
- Die ersten 125 Jahre. Publisher: Josef Zindel im Friedrich Reinhardt Verlag, Basel. ISBN 978-3-7245-2305-5
- Verein "Basler Fussballarchiv" Homepage

(NB: Despite all efforts, the editors of these books and the authors in "Basler Fussballarchiv" have failed to be able to identify all the players, their date and place of birth or date and place of death, who played in the games during the early years of FC Basel.)
