= Paul Nosch =

Footballer

Personal information
- Full name: Paul Nosch
- Positions: Midfielder; striker

Senior career*
Years	Team	Apps	(Gls)
1901–1903	FC Basel	3	(0)
- * Club domestic league appearances and goals

Paul Nosch (date of birth unknown) was a footballer who played as forward or midfielder in the early 1900s.

== Football career ==
Nosch joined FC Basel's first team for their 1901–02 season. He had previously played for their second team, who were playing at the time in Serie B, the second tier of Swiss football. Nosch made his domestic league debut for the first team in an away game on 17 November 1901 as Basel were defeated 0–2 by Young Boys. Nosch played one more friendly game for the first team that season, an away game in Mulhouse, as Basel won 3–1 against French team FC Mulhouse on 26 January 1902. Various other members of the second team also played in this game.

In their 1902–03 season Nosch also played two games with the first team, but in the following season he returned to the second team. During his time with the first team Nosched played a total of four games for Basel without scoring a goal. Three of these games were in the Serie A and one was a friendly game.

== Sources ==
- Rotblau: Jahrbuch Saison 2017/2018. Publisher: FC Basel Marketing AG. ISBN 978-3-7245-2189-1
- Die ersten 125 Jahre. Publisher: Josef Zindel im Friedrich Reinhardt Verlag, Basel. ISBN 978-3-7245-2305-5
- Verein "Basler Fussballarchiv" Homepage
