= 1903–04 Swiss Serie A =

Swiss football season

Swiss Serie A
- Season: 1903–04

Statistics of association football in Switzerland during the 1903–04 season.

== East ==
Pos	Team	Pld	W	D	L	GF	GA	GD	Pts
1	FC St. Gallen	8	7	0	1	28	6	+22	14
2	Grasshopper Club Zürich	8	6	0	2	25	15	+10	12
3	FC Zürich	8	4	0	4	19	10	+9	8
4	Blue Stars St. Gallen	8	2	0	6	18	28	−10	4
5	American Wanderers Zürich	8	1	0	7	2	33	−31	2

Source: rsssf

== Central ==
Pos	Team	Pld	W	D	L	GF	GA	GD	Pts
1	BSC Old Boys Basel	10	8	1	1	41	11	+30	17
2	Young Boys Bern	10	8	1	1	37	14	+23	17
3	FC Basel	10	5	2	3	28	25	+3	12
4	FC Bern	10	3	3	4	19	20	−1	9
5	Floria Biel/Bienne	10	2	1	7	11	38	−27	5
6	Fortuna Basel	10	0	0	10	4	32	−28	0

Source: rsssf

Play-off

Team 1	Score	Team 2
Old Boys	3–2	Young Boys

== West ==
Pos	Team	Pld	W	D	L	GF	GA	GD	Pts
1	Servette Genf	6	5	1	0	12	0	+12	11
2	Lausanne Sports	6	2	2	2	20	9	+11	6
3	FC Neuchâtel	6	2	0	4	6	23	−17	4
4	FC La Chaux-de-Fonds	6	1	1	4	9	15	−6	3

Source: rsssf

== Final ==
=== Table ===
Pos	Team	Pld	W	D	L	GF	GA	GD	Pts
1	FC St. Gallen	2	1	1	0	2	1	+1	3
2	BSC Old Boys Basel	2	1	0	1	2	1	+1	2
3	Servette Genf	2	0	1	1	1	3	−2	1

Source: rsssf

=== Results ===
Team 1	Score	Team 2
27 March 1904
St. Gallen	1–1	Servette
10 April 1904
St. Gallen	1–0	Old Boys
17 April 1904
Old Boys	2–0	Servette FC

FC St. Gallen won the championship.

== Sources ==
- Switzerland 1903-04 at RSSSF
