= 1907–08 Swiss Serie A =

Swiss football season

Swiss Serie A
- Season: 1907–08

Statistics of Swiss Super League in the 1907–08 season.

== East ==
=== Table ===
Pos	Team	Pld	W	D	L	GF	GA	GD	Pts
1	FC Winterthur	14	10	2	2	47	22	+25	22
2	Old Boys Basel	14	7	2	5	33	29	+4	16
3	FC Basel	14	6	2	6	40	39	+1	14
4	Grasshopper Club Zürich	14	6	1	7	38	40	−2	13
5	FC Zürich	14	6	1	7	36	39	−3	13
6	Young Fellows Zürich	14	5	3	6	31	46	−15	13
7	FC St. Gallen	14	4	3	7	32	38	−6	11
8	FC Aarau	14	5	0	9	39	43	−4	10

Source: rsssf

== West ==
=== Table ===
Pos	Team	Pld	W	D	L	GF	GA	GD	Pts
1	Young Boys Bern	12	10	0	2	40	17	+23	20
2	Servette Genf	12	9	0	3	37	16	+21	18
3	Lausanne Sports	12	6	0	6	30	25	+5	12
4	Cantonal Neuchatel	12	5	1	6	30	27	+3	11
5	FC La Chaux-de-Fonds	12	3	2	7	27	40	−13	8
6	FC Bern	12	3	2	7	12	30	−18	8
7	Vereinigter FC Biel	12	3	1	8	27	48	−21	7

Source: rsssf

== Final ==
Team 1	Score	Team 2
31 May 1908
Winterthur	4–1	Young Boys

FC Winterthur won the championship.

== Sources ==
- Switzerland 1907-08 at RSSSF
