= Eugen Stutz =

Swiss footballer

Personal information
- Full name: Eugen Stutz
- Date of birth: unknown
- Place of birth: Switzerland
- Position: Goalkeeper

Senior career*
Years	Team	Apps	(Gls)
1901–1905	FC Basel	5+	(0)
- * Club domestic league appearances and goals

Eugen Stutz (date of birth unknown) was a Swiss footballer who played as goalkeeper during the early 1900s.

== Football career ==
Stutz joined FC Basel's first team for their 1901–02 season. During his first season with the team, he played in two test games and again during his second season he also played another two friendlies. He also played for their reserve team in the Serie B, the second tier of Swiss football.

Stutz played his domestic league debut for the Basel's first team in their 1903–04 season. This was in the home game in the Landhof on 21 February 1904 and he held a clean sheet as Basel won 3–0 against FC Bern. In his second league game he also held a clean sheet and at the end of the season helped the team out of the relegation zone and Basel finished the season in third position in the group table.

He stayed with the team another season and while with them Stutz played a total of 12 games for Basel. Five of these games were in the Swiss Series A and seven were friendly games. He probably played in more games than mentioned, but the documentation is not complete. (Note: The player lines-ups and goal scorers for 2 of the 9 league games in the 1903–04 season are unknown or incomplete.) (Note: The player lines-ups and goal scorers for 3 of the 8 league games in the 1904–05 season are unknown or incomplete.)

== Notes ==
=== Footnotes ===
Incomplete league matches 1903–1904 season: Bern-FCB, FCB-OB

Incomplete league matches 1904–1905 season: FCB-Bern, OB-FCB, FCB-YB

=== Sources ===
- Rotblau: Jahrbuch Saison 2017/2018. Publisher: FC Basel Marketing AG. ISBN 978-3-7245-2189-1
- Die ersten 125 Jahre. Publisher: Josef Zindel im Friedrich Reinhardt Verlag, Basel. ISBN 978-3-7245-2305-5
- Verein "Basler Fussballarchiv" Homepage

(NB: Despite all efforts, the editors of these books and the authors in "Basler Fussballarchiv" have failed to be able to identify all the players, their date and place of birth or date and place of death, who played in the games during the early years of FC Basel.)
