= Max Palatini =

Swiss footballer

Personal information
- Full name: Max Palatini
- Date of birth: unknown
- Place of birth: Switzerland
- Position: Midfielder

Senior career*
Years	Team	Apps	(Gls)
1907–1912	FC Basel	19	(0)
- * Club domestic league appearances and goals

Max Palatini (date of birth unknown) was a Swiss footballer who played for FC Basel as midfielder.

Palatini joined Basel's first team for their 1907–08 season. Palatini played his domestic league debut for the club in the away game on 10 November 1907 as Basel lost 3–5 against Zürich.

Between the years 1907 and 1912 Palatini played a total of 33 games for Basel without scoring a goal. 19 of these games were in the Swiss Serie A, two in the Swiss-Anglo Cup and 12 were friendly games.

== Sources ==
- Rotblau: Jahrbuch Saison 2017/2018. Publisher: FC Basel Marketing AG. ISBN 978-3-7245-2189-1
- Die ersten 125 Jahre. Publisher: Josef Zindel im Friedrich Reinhardt Verlag, Basel. ISBN 978-3-7245-2305-5
- Verein "Basler Fussballarchiv" Homepage

(NB: Despite all efforts, the editors of these books and the authors in "Basler Fussballarchiv" have failed to be able to identify all the players, their date and place of birth or date and place of death, who played in the games during the early years of FC Basel)
