= P. Lozéron =

Footballer

Personal information
- Full name: P. Lozéron
- Positions: Midfielder; striker

Senior career*
| Years | Team | Apps | (Gls) |
| 1900–1904 | FC Basel | 5 | (0) |
- * Club domestic league appearances and goals

P. Lozéron (date of birth unknown) was a footballer who played as forward or as midfielder during the early 1900s.

== Football career ==
Lozéron joined FC Basel for their 1900–01 season, but he played mainly for their second team in the Serie B, the second tier of Swiss football. For the first team this season was a bad season, they ended the group stage in fifth position. A curiosity in this season was the away game on 3 March 1901. This was an away game against Grasshopper Club and it ended in a 3–13 defeat. The reasons for this high defeat can be explained with the fact that one of the players missed the train and that the team played with a number of players from their reserve team. Nevertheless, to date this remains the teams’ highest and biggest defeat in the club's history. In his first season with the club, he played his first game for them in the away game in Mulhouse on 11 May 1901 as Basel won 4–1 against an Alsace selection.

In the next season he probably also played in just one friendly game. (Note: The player lines-ups in 1 friendly game and 1 league match, as well as the goal scorers in 3 of the 7 league games during the 1901–02 season are unknown or incomplete.) This was also in Mulhouse against FC Mulhouse and was also won 4–1. In their 1902–03 season Lozéron played his domestic league debut for the club in the home game on 2 November 1902 as Basel were defeated 1–4 by FC Bern. In this season Lozéron played in five of the club's eight league matches and in the following season he played just one friendly match.

Between the years 1900 and 1904 Lozéron played at least eight games for Basel without scoring a goal. (Note: Scorers: many pre-First World War game sheets either no longer exist or are incomplete and so, many line ups and most goal scorers in this period remain unknown.) Five of these games were in the Nationalliga A and three were friendly games.

== Notes ==
=== Footnotes ===
Incomplete league matches 1901–1902 season: FCB-OB, Excelsior-FCB, FCB-Fortuna

=== Sources ===
- Rotblau: Jahrbuch Saison 2017/2018. Publisher: FC Basel Marketing AG. ISBN 978-3-7245-2189-1
- Die ersten 125 Jahre. Publisher: Josef Zindel im Friedrich Reinhardt Verlag, Basel. ISBN 978-3-7245-2305-5
- Verein "Basler Fussballarchiv" Homepage
