= Alphonse Schorpp =

Swiss footballer (born 1881)

Personal information
- Full name: Victor Alfonso Schorpp
- Date of birth: 5 January 1881
- Place of birth: Switzerland
- Date of death: unknown
- Position: Midfielder

Senior career*
Years	Team	Apps	(Gls)
1899–1903	FC Basel	24	(3)
- * Club domestic league appearances and goals

Alphonse Schorpp (born 5 January 1881) was a Swiss footballer who played as midfielder in the early 1900s.

Schorpp joined FC Basel's first team for their 1899–1900 season. Schorpp played his first game for the club in the friendly game at home in the Landhof on 12 November 1899 as Basel won 3–1 against FC Concordia Zürich. Basel did not play in this season's domestic league. Schorpp played regularly with the team and was recorded as having played in 14 of the team's 16 games during this season.

However, the following season Basel did compete in the 1900–01 Swiss Serie A. Schorpp was nominated as team captain by the club's board of directors under chairman Ernst-Alfred Thalmann. Schorpp played his domestic league debut for the club in the home game on 28 October 1900 as Basel played a 1–1 draw with Fire Flies Zürich. Basel ended the league season in fifth position in the group table with two victories, two draws and six defeats.

Schorpp scored his first league goal for his club on 3 March 1901 in the away game against Grasshopper Club. In fact he scored two goals, but this could not save the team from a 3–13 defeat. The reasons for this defeat can be explained with the fact that one of the players missed the train and that the team played with a number of players from their reserve team. Nevertheless, to date this remains the team's highest and biggest defeat in the club's history.

In their next two seasons Schorpp remained as team captain. Basel ended the group stage of the 1901–02 Swiss Serie A season in second position and the 1902–03 Swiss Serie A in third position in the group table.

Between the years 1899 and 1903 Schorpp played a total of at least 59 games for Basel scoring a total of six goals. 24 of these games were in the Nationalliga A and 35 were friendly games. He scored three goals in the domestic league and the other three were scored during the test games.

== Sources ==
- Rotblau: Jahrbuch Saison 2017/2018. Publisher: FC Basel Marketing AG. ISBN 978-3-7245-2189-1
- Die ersten 125 Jahre. Publisher: Josef Zindel im Friedrich Reinhardt Verlag, Basel. ISBN 978-3-7245-2305-5
- Verein "Basler Fussballarchiv" Homepage

(NB: Despite all efforts, the editors of these books and the authors in "Basler Fussballarchiv" have failed to be able to identify all the players, their date and place of birth or date and place of death, who played in the games during the early years of FC Basel)
