= 1902–03 Swiss Serie A =

Swiss football season

Swiss Serie A
- Season: 1902–03

Statistics of Swiss Super League in the 1902–03 season.

== East ==
Pos	Team	Pld	W	D	L	GF	GA	GD	Pts
1	FC Zürich	10	8	1	1	37	9	+28	17
2	Vereinigte FC St. Gallen	9	6	2	1	22	6	+16	14
3	Grasshopper Club Zürich	9	5	0	4	26	19	+7	10
4	Blue Stars St. Gallen	9	3	1	5	24	25	−1	7
5	International Zürich	9	1	0	8	9	52	−43	2
6	FC Winterthur	6	1	0	5	7	14	−7	2

Source: rsssf

== Central ==
Pos	Team	Pld	W	D	L	GF	GA	GD	Pts
1	Young Boys Bern	7	6	0	1	29	5	+24	12
2	BSC Old Boys Basel	7	5	1	1	16	7	+9	11
3	FC Basel	8	3	0	5	13	20	−7	6
4	FC Bern	7	1	1	5	10	21	−11	3
5	Fortuna Basel (D)	5	1	0	4	3	18	−15	2

Source: rsssf
(D) Disqualified

== West ==
Pos	Team	Pld	W	D	L	GF	GA	GD	Pts
1	FC Neuchâtel	6	4	0	2	17	8	+9	8
2	FC La Chaux-de-Fonds	6	2	1	3	14	12	+2	5
3	Lausanne Sports	6	2	1	3	8	12	−4	5
4	Servette Genf	6	2	0	4	9	16	−7	4

Source: rsssf

== Final ==
=== Table ===
Pos	Team	Pld	W	D	L	GF	GA	GD	Pts
1	Young Boys Bern (C)	2	2	0	0	8	1	+7	4
2	FC Zürich	1	0	0	1	1	3	−2	0
3	FC Neuchâtel	1	0	0	1	0	5	−5	0

Source: rsssf
(C) Champions

=== Results ===
Team 1	Score	Team 2
22 March 1903
Young Boys	3–1	Zürich
29 March 1903
Young Boys	5–0	Neuchâtel

The match between Zürich and Neuchâtel was not played because the two teams no longer competing for the title.

Young Boys Bern won the championship.

== Sources ==
- Switzerland 1902-03 at RSSSF
