= Emil Hasler (footballer) =

Swiss footballer (1883-1932)

Personal information
- Full name: Emil Hasler
- Date of birth: 29 July 1883
- Place of birth: Switzerland
- Date of death: 7 December 1932 (aged 49)
- Position: Midfielder

Senior career*
Years	Team	Apps	(Gls)
1900–1922	FC Basel	85	(45)

International career
1908–1911	Switzerland	4	(1)
- * Club domestic league appearances and goals

Emil Hasler (29 July 1883 – 7 December 1932) was a Swiss international footballer who played for FC Basel. He played mainly in the position as midfielder, but also as striker.

== Club career ==
Hasler joined FC Basel's first team during their 1900–01 season. Due to his age, Hasler only played in two friendly games for the team that season. Hasler played his first game for the club in the away game on 5 May 1901 as Basel were defeated 0–3 by La Chaux-de-Fonds. Again in the following season he also only played friendly matches, but he scored his first goal for the team on 11 May 1902 in the away friendly game as Basel won 4–1 against French team FC Mulhouse.

Hasler first played league football during their 1902–03 season. He played his domestic league debut for the club in the home game in the Landhof on 23 November 1902 and he scored his first league goal in this match. However, it could not help the team as Basel were beaten 1–2 by local rivals Old Boys.

Their 1906–07 season was interesting and it came to following curiosity. As it came to the last group game of the season, at home against the Old Boys, Basel were leading the table two points ahead of their opponents. However, in this last match despite a two-goal lead, the goals being scored by Dr. Siegfried Pfeiffer and Max Senn, their local rivals turned the game and won three goals to two. Subsequently it came to a play-off to see who would advance to the finals. The play-off match was interrupted in the 50th minute due to a storm and following the restart it ended in a 1–1 draw. Thus, it required a reply one week later and this was also drawn 1–1. They played 2x 10 minutes extra time, but neither team scored. Therefore, both teams agreed to play a further 15 minutes, but again neither team scored. Another week later it then came to a second replay which Basel decided quite clearly with 4–1 for themselves. Basel advanced to the finals for the first time in their history. The final was played as a round robin tournament. In the first match they were beaten 1–5 by west group winners Servette and in the second 2–3 by Young Fellows Zürich. Ernst-Alfred Thalmann netted the only goal against Servette. Hasler himself and Eugen Strauss netted the goals again YF. Servette won the deciding match and became Swiss champions for the first time in their club's history.

In the following seasons Hasler was always a regular starter, but most match cards are no longer existent. (Note: The player lines-ups and goal scorers for 6 of the 10 league games in the 1909–10 season are either unknown or are incomplete.) (Note: The player lines-ups and goal scorers for 10 of the 14 league games in the 1910–11 season are either unknown or are incomplete.) (Note: The player lines-ups and goal scorers for 6 of the 14 league games in the 1911–12 season are either unknown or are incomplete.)

The Englishman Percy Humphreys was the first professional trainer that the club FC Basel had ever employed and he joined the club towards the end of the 1912–13 FC Basel season. The Anglo-Cup was a forerunner to the Swiss Cup. It was held for the fourth time this season and Humphreys started his work exactly here. Hasler played in the final, which was played in the Hardau Stadium in Zürich on 29 June 1913, Basel played against lower classed Weissenbühl Bern and won 5–0. Humphreys led Basel to win their first national title. But memories of this soon faded, because the Anglo Cup was not played the following year and in fact it was discontinued completely due to World War I.

Humphreys had to return to England as the first world war broke out, but football in Switzerland continued, albeit slightly reduced, because some teams no longer had playing fields. Hasler scored seven goals in six matches during the 1914–15 and seven goals in seven matches during the 1915–16 season. Hasler played his last two league matches in the 1917–18 FC Basel season. On the 28 October 1917, in the home match Hasler scored his last two goals for the team as they won 3–0 against local rivals Old Boys. In his last game on 18 November Basel were defeated 1–4 by Aarau. During the 1920–21 and 1921–22 season he played four more friendly games and then he hung his football boots on the hook.

Between the years 1900 and 1922 Hasler played at least 165 games for Basel scoring at least 71 goals. 85 of these games were in the Swiss Serie A, four in the Anglo Cup and 76 were friendly games. He scored 45 goals in the domestic league, two in the cup and the other 24 were scored during the test games.

== International career ==
Hasler was also member of the Swiss national team between 1908 and 1911. He played his international debut in the friendly match between Switzerland and France on 8 March 1908 in Geneva, which the Swiss lost 1–2. He scored his only goal for the national team during his fourth and last game for Switzerland on 7 May 1911 as they drew 2–2 with Italy in the Arena Civica in Milan.

== Notes ==
=== Footnotes ===
Incomplete league matches 1909–1910 season: YB-FCB, FCB-Biel, Luzern-FCB, Bern-FCB, FCB-YB, Biel-FCB

Incomplete league matches 1910–11 season: Aarau-FCB, FCB-YB, Stella-FCB, FCB-Biel, FCB-Aarau, YB-FCB, FCB-Stella, OB-FCB, Bern-FCB and Biel-FCB

Incomplete league matches 1911–12 season: FCB-Nordstern, LcdF-FCB, Sporting-FCB, Biel-FCB, FCB-Biel, YB-FCB

=== Sources ===
- Rotblau: Jahrbuch Saison 2017/2018. Publisher: FC Basel Marketing AG. ISBN 978-3-7245-2189-1
- Die ersten 125 Jahre. Publisher: Josef Zindel im Friedrich Reinhardt Verlag, Basel. ISBN 978-3-7245-2305-5
- Verein "Basler Fussballarchiv" Homepage
