= Werner Stutz (footballer) =

Swiss footballer (born 1883)

Personal information
- Full name: Werner Stutz
- Date of birth: 31 March 1883
- Place of birth: Switzerland
- Positions: Midfielder; striker

Senior career*
Years	Team	Apps	(Gls)
1899–1904	FC Basel	7	(0)
- * Club domestic league appearances and goals

Werner Stutz (born 31 March 1883) was a Swiss footballer who played as forward or midfielder.

== Football career ==
Stutz joined FC Basel's first team during their 1899–1900 season. In this season the club did not compete in the Swiss Serie A, they played only friendly games. Stutz played only one friendly game on 15 April 1900 as Basel were defeated 4–5 by Zürich. The following season he played with Basel's reserve team who at that time played in the Serie B, the second tier of Swiss football. In their 1901–02 season, after playing in another test game, Stutz played his domestic league debut for the club in the away game on 20 October 1901 as Basel were defeated 0–2 by local rivals Old Boys.

He stayed with the team until 1904 and during his time with them, Stutz played a total of 14 games for Basel without scoring a goal. Seven of these games were in the Swiss Serie A and seven were friendly games. He probably played in more games than mentioned, but the documentation is incomplete. (Note: The player lines-ups in 1 match and goal scorers in 3 matches of the 7 league games during the 1901–02 season are unknown or incomplete.) (Note: The player lines-ups and goal scorers for 2 of the 9 league games in the 1903–04 season are unknown or incomplete.)

== Notes ==
=== Footnotes ===
Incomplete league matches 1901–1902 season: FCB-OB, Excelsior-FCB, FCB-Fortuna

Incomplete league matches 1903–1904 season: Bern-FCB, FCB-OB

=== Sources ===
- Rotblau: Jahrbuch Saison 2017/2018. Publisher: FC Basel Marketing AG. ISBN 978-3-7245-2189-1
- Die ersten 125 Jahre. Publisher: Josef Zindel im Friedrich Reinhardt Verlag, Basel. ISBN 978-3-7245-2305-5
- Verein "Basler Fussballarchiv" Homepage

(NB: Despite all efforts, the editors of these books and the authors in "Basler Fussballarchiv" have failed to be able to identify all the players, their date and place of birth or date and place of death, who played in the games during the early years of FC Basel.)
