= Adolf Ramseyer =

Swiss footballer (1883–1951)

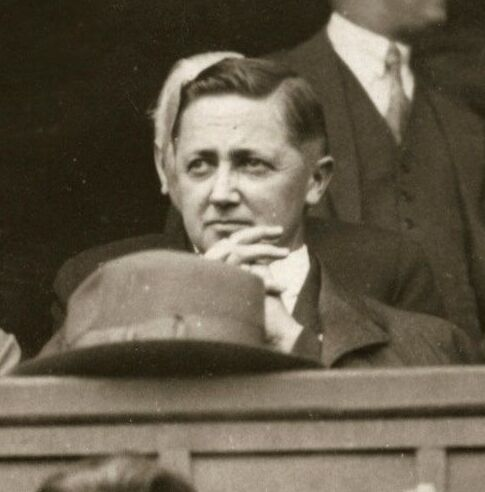
- Ramseyer in 1928

Personal information
- Full name: Adolf Ramseyer
- Date of birth: 1883
- Place of birth: Switzerland
- Date of death: 22 February 1951 (aged 67–68)
- Place of death: Basel, Switzerland
- Position: Defender

Senior career*
| Years | Team | Apps | (Gls) |
| 1901–1908 | FC Basel | 40+ | (1) |
- * Club domestic league appearances and goals

Adolf Ramseyer (1883 – 22 February 1951) was a Swiss footballer who played for FC Basel in the early 1900s as defender.

Ramseyer joined Basel's first team for their 1901–02 season. After playing in two test games, Ramseyer played his domestic league debut for the club in the away game on 20 October 1901 as Basel were defeated 0–2 by Old Boys.

Ramseyer scored his first goal for his club on 28 February 1904 in the home game in the Landhof against FC Floria Biel-Bienne as Basel won 6–0. At that time, FC Floria were an independent team and they withdrew from the league at the end of the season. They then merged with FC Biel-Bienne.

In the 1906–07 Swiss Serie A season Basel and Old Boys ended the central group level on points. As it came to the last group game of the season, at home against the Old Boys, Basel were leading the table two points ahead of their opponents. However, in this last match despite a two-goal lead, the goals being scored by Dr. Siegfried Pfeiffer and Max Senn, their local rivals turned the game and won three goals to two.

Subsequently, it came to a play-off to see who would advance to the finals. The play-off match was interrupted in the 50th minute due to a storm and following the restart it ended in a 1–1 draw. Thus, it required a reply one week later and this was also drawn 1–1. They played 2x 10 minutes extra time, but neither team scored. Therefore, both teams agreed to play a further 15 minutes, but neither team scored. Another week later it then came to a second replay which Basel decided with 4–1 for themselves. Basel advanced to the finals, but were beaten 1–5 by west group winners Servette and 2–3 by east group winners Young Fellows Zürich. Servette won the deciding match and became Swiss champions.

Between the years 1901 and 1908 Ramseyer played at least 56 games for Basel scoring two goals. 40 of these games were in the Nationalliga A and 16 were friendly games. He scored the afore mentioned goal in the domestic league and the other was scored during the test games. (Note: The player lines-ups and goal scorers for 4 of the 8 league games in the 1906–07 season are unknown or incomplete.)

In 1917 Ramseyer was awarded the honorary membership of the Swiss Football Association for his services to football.

== Notes ==
=== Footnotes ===
- 1906–07 season matches: YB-FCB, OB-FCB, FCB-YB, FCB-Aarau

=== Sources ===
- Rotblau: Jahrbuch Saison 2017/2018. Publisher: FC Basel Marketing AG. ISBN 978-3-7245-2189-1
- Die ersten 125 Jahre. Publisher: Josef Zindel im Friedrich Reinhardt Verlag, Basel. ISBN 978-3-7245-2305-5
- Verein "Basler Fussballarchiv" Homepage
