= Josef Goldschmidt =

German footballer

Personal information
- Full name: Josef Goldschmidt
- Date of birth: unknown
- Place of birth: Germany
- Date of death: unknown
- Position: Midfielder

Senior career*
Years	Team	Apps	(Gls)
1905–1914	FC Basel	56	(1)
- * Club domestic league appearances and goals

Josef Goldschmidt (* unknown; † unknown) was a German footballer who played for FC Basel. He played mainly in the position as midfielder.

Between the years 1905 and 1914 Goldschmidt played a total of 77 games for Basel, scoring a total of 4 goals. 56 of these games were in the Swiss Serie A, two in the Anglo-Cup and 19 were friendly games. He scored one goal in the domestic league, the other three were scored during the test games.

In the 1912–13 season Basel won the Anglo-Cup. Goldschmidt was part of the team that won the final on 29 June 1913 in the Hardau Stadium, Zürich against FC Weissenbühl Bern 5–0.

== Sources and References ==
- Rotblau: Jahrbuch Saison 2017/2018. Publisher: FC Basel Marketing AG. ISBN 978-3-7245-2189-1
