= 1906–07 Swiss Serie A =

Swiss football season

Swiss Serie A
- Season: 1906–07

Statistics of Swiss Super League in the 1906–07 season.

== East ==
=== Table ===
| Pos | Team | Pld | W | D | L | GF | GA | GD | Pts |
|---|---|---|---|---|---|---|---|---|---|
| 1 | Young Fellows Zürich | 10 | 8 | 0 | 2 | 38 | 27 | +11 | 16 |
| 2 | FC Winterthur | 10 | 7 | 2 | 1 | 41 | 9 | +32 | 16 |
| 3 | Grasshopper Club Zürich | 10 | 5 | 3 | 2 | 32 | 14 | +18 | 13 |
| 4 | FC St. Gallen | 9 | 3 | 2 | 4 | 19 | 18 | +1 | 8 |
| 5 | FC Zürich | 9 | 1 | 1 | 7 | 14 | 46 | −32 | 3 |
| 6 | Blue Stars St. Gallen | 10 | 1 | 0 | 9 | 19 | 49 | −30 | 2 |

Source: rsssf

== Central ==
=== Table ===
| Pos | Team | Pld | W | D | L | GF | GA | GD | Pts |
|---|---|---|---|---|---|---|---|---|---|
| 1 | FC Basel | 8 | 5 | 0 | 3 | 30 | 20 | +10 | 10 |
| 2 | Old Boys Basel | 8 | 5 | 0 | 3 | 20 | 18 | +2 | 10 |
| 3 | Young Boys Bern | 8 | 4 | 0 | 4 | 21 | 17 | +4 | 8 |
| 4 | FC Bern | 8 | 4 | 0 | 4 | 16 | 21 | −5 | 8 |
| 5 | FC Aarau | 8 | 2 | 0 | 6 | 14 | 25 | −11 | 4 |

Source: rsssf

== West ==
=== Table ===
| Pos | Team | Pld | W | D | L | GF | GA | GD | Pts |
|---|---|---|---|---|---|---|---|---|---|
| 1 | Servette Genf | 8 | 4 | 4 | 0 | 22 | 11 | +11 | 12 |
| 2 | Cantonal Neuchatel | 8 | 5 | 1 | 2 | 16 | 8 | +8 | 11 |
| 3 | FC La Chaux-de-Fonds | 8 | 4 | 2 | 2 | 18 | 11 | +7 | 10 |
| 4 | Lausanne Sports | 8 | 2 | 1 | 5 | 16 | 23 | −7 | 5 |
| 5 | FC Genf | 8 | 0 | 2 | 6 | 12 | 31 | −19 | 2 |

Source: rsssf

== Final ==
=== Table ===
| Pos | Team | Pld | W | D | L | GF | GA | GD | Pts |
|---|---|---|---|---|---|---|---|---|---|
| 1 | Servette Genf | 2 | 2 | 0 | 0 | 6 | 1 | +5 | 4 |
| 2 | Young Fellows Zürich | 2 | 1 | 0 | 1 | 3 | 3 | 0 | 2 |
| 3 | FC Basel | 2 | 0 | 0 | 2 | 3 | 8 | −5 | 0 |

Source: rsssf

=== Results ===
| Team 1 | Score | Team 2 |
|---|---|---|
28 April 1907
| Servette | 5–1 | Basel |
5 May 1907
| Young Fellows | 3–2 | Basel |
12 May 1907
| Servette | 1–0 (a.e.t.) | Young Fellows |

Servette Genf won the championship.

== Sources ==
- Switzerland 1906-07 at RSSSF
