= Eduard Laubi =

Swiss footballer (born 1881)

Personal information
- Full name: Eduard Laubi
- Date of birth: 1 May 1881
- Place of birth: Switzerland
- Date of death: unknown
- Positions: Midfielder; striker

Senior career*
| Years | Team | Apps | (Gls) |
| 1900–1904 | FC Basel | 19 | (3) |
- * Club domestic league appearances and goals

Eduard Laubi (born 2 May 1881) was a Swiss footballer who played in the early 1900s. He played mainly as striker, but also as midfielder.

Laubi joined FC Basel's first team during their 1900–01 FC Basel season. After playing in two test games Laubi played his domestic league debut for the club in the away game on 10 February 1901 as Basel were defeated 2–3 by Fire Flies Zürich. For the team this was a bad season, they ended the season in fifth position in the group stage.

A curiosity in this season was the away game on 3 March 1901. This was an away game against Grasshopper Club and it ended in a 3–13 defeat. The reasons for this high defeat can be explained with the fact that one of the players missed the train and that the team played with a number of players from their reserve team. Nevertheless, to date this remains the teams’ highest and biggest defeat in the club’s history.

Laubi scored his first goal for his club during the next season, on 3 November 1901 in the away game as Basel won 4–1 against Fortuna Basel. Compared to the previous season, Basel played better this league season and ended the group stage in second position in the table.

He was with the team for four seasons and during this time Laubi played a total of 36 games for Basel scoring a total of six goals. 19 of these games were in the Nationalliga A and 17 were friendly games. He scored three goals in the domestic league and the other three were scored during the test games.

== Sources ==
- Rotblau: Jahrbuch Saison 2017/2018. Publisher: FC Basel Marketing AG. ISBN 978-3-7245-2189-1
- Die ersten 125 Jahre. Publisher: Josef Zindel im Friedrich Reinhardt Verlag, Basel. ISBN 978-3-7245-2305-5
- Verein "Basler Fussballarchiv" Homepage

(NB: Despite all efforts, the editors of these books and the authors in "Basler Fussballarchiv" have failed to be able to identify all the players, their date and place of birth or date and place of death, who played in the games during the early years of FC Basel.)
