= Max Senn =

Swiss watchmaker and footballer

Personal information
- Full name: Max Senn
- Date of birth: 11 February 1883
- Place of birth: Basel, Switzerland
- Date of death: 21 July 1933 (aged 50)
- Place of death: Basel, Switzerland
- Position: Striker

Youth career
- until 1901: FC Basel

Senior career*
Years	Team	Apps	(Gls)
1901–1903	Hannoverscher Fußball-Club 1896		
1906–1908	FC Basel	22	(10)
- * Club domestic league appearances and goals

Max Senn (born 11 February 1883 – 21 July 1933) was a Swiss watchmaker and football player. He played as striker.

== Private life ==
Born in Basel, Max Senn was the son of the Basel watchmaker Emil Senn and his wife Frida née Bürgin. For professional reasons in 1901 he moved Hannover and worked for the firm Uhren-Stellmann as instructor for watchmakers for at least two years. After a lengthy, unspecified absence, he registered back in Basel on 3 August 1906. On 18 February 1909, he married Emma Louise Karolina Zehnder, born 24 September 1870. The couple had four children: Max Kurt, born 24 April 1910; Emil Alfred, born 15 December 1911, Jeanne Louise, born 20 November 1914; Yvonne, born 15 June 1916. Senn ran his own watchmaking business, but had to file for bankruptcy in November 1926. He died on 21 July 1933.

== Football career ==
Senn played his youth football with FC Basel. In 1901 he joined Hannoverscher Fußball-Club 1896, a forerunner of the club Hannover 96. Apart from the fact that a number of English people were involved in the founding of many German football clubs, the player Max Senn is one of the first foreigners ever to be on record in German football. He was the first Swiss person to be top scorer in the German League.

Senn rejoined Basel, in first team, for their 1906–07 season. He played his first friendly match for Basel 14 October 1906. He scored both goals as Basel won 2–1 against Grasshopper Club. Senn played his domestic league debut for the club in the away game on 28 October as Basel won 6–2 against FC Bern. He scored his first (recorded) league goal for his club in the away game on 18 November. It was the match winning goal as Basel won 2–1 against Aarau. At the end of the league group stage Basel had to compete in a play-off against Old Boys, which they won on the third attempt. Basel thus advanced to the finals, but were beaten in both games.

Senn remained with the club for another season. In the home game at the Landhof on 18 November 1907 he scored a hat-trick as Basel won 6–0 against Young Fellows Zürich. Together with Siegfried Pfeiffer, Senn was the club's top league goal scorer that season. Both netted seven times.

Between the years 1906 and 1908 Senn played a total of 28 games for Basel scoring a total of 13 goals. 22 of these games were in the Nationalliga A and the others were friendly games. He scored 10 goals in the domestic league, the other three were scored during the test games.

== Sources ==
- Rotblau: Jahrbuch Saison 2017/2018. Publisher: FC Basel Marketing AG. ISBN 978-3-7245-2189-1
- Die ersten 125 Jahre. Publisher: Josef Zindel im Friedrich Reinhardt Verlag, Basel. ISBN 978-3-7245-2305-5
- Verein "Basler Fussballarchiv" homepage
- Hannover 96 homepage
