= Ernst-Alfred Thalmann =

Swiss footballer (1881–1938)

Personal information
- Full name: Ernst-Alfred Thalmann
- Date of birth: 8 April 1881
- Place of birth: Basel, Switzerland
- Date of death: 23 September 1938 (aged 57)
- Place of death: Basel, Switzerland
- Position: Striker

Senior career*
Years	Team	Apps	(Gls)
1897–1908	FC Basel	58	(11)

International career
1905	Switzerland	1	(0)
- * Club domestic league appearances and goals

Ernst-Alfred Thalmann (8 April 1881 – 23 September 1938) was a Switzerland national football team footballer, jurist, politician and private art collector.

== Early life ==
Thalmann was born in Basel, the son of a teacher, and attended primary school and the Humanistic Gymnasium in the city. He then studied law at the universities in Basel, Berlin and Paris.

== Football ==
In his early years, Thalmann successfully played football for FC Basel and was a member of the Switzerland national team. FC Basel was founded on 15 November 1893 and Thalmann joined Basel's first team some four years later, for their 1897–98 season. Although the first national championship in Switzerland took place in 1897–98, it is considered as unofficial because it was not organized by the Swiss Football Association (ASF-SFV, founded in 1895). Basel did not participate in this first championship. Thalmann played his first game for the club in the home game in the Landhof on 14 November 1897 as Basel won 3–1 against FC Excelsior Zürich. He scored his first goal for his club in the away game on 13 March 1898. In fact he scored two goals as Basel won 5–2 against Biel-Bienne.

The first edition of the official Swiss championship season 1898–99 was played as a knock out competition, divided into three regional groups, an east (region Zürich), a central (regional north-west Switzerland) and west group (Romandy). The winners of each group played the finals in a round-robin tournament. Basel played in the central group semi-final against Old Boys. Thalmann played his league debut for the club in this home game at the Landhof on 13 November 1898. Because the game was drawn, one goal each, it required a replay. This replay was held in the Stadion Schützenmatte on 18 December 1898. This was also drawn 2–2, despite an agreed 2x 20 minutes extra time. Because the Old Boys complained that the first FCB goal scored by Rudolf La Roche in the 10th minute had been scored by hand, they protested and the ASF-SFV had to deal with the matter. Subsequently, the protest was approved and the game awarded - and the disputed goal was simply deducted from the score to give the final result. Thus the Old Boys became the first forfait winners in Swiss football history and Basel were knocked out of the competition. The Old Boys advanced to the finals, but the Anglo-American Club Zürich became Swiss champions.

A curiosity in their 1898–99 season was the friendly game in Zürich on 5 March 1899. The majority of them English students, had formed a club and the members of the Anglo-American Club even attended the founder meeting of the Swiss Football Association (ASF-SFV) in April 1895. They had found a place to play their games, although the Zurich commons was by no means ideal. It was often that the players found the grounds very sludgy or with freshly raised molehills. But at least, it was a homestead that was soon called "Anglo-Platz". Suddenly the announcement: "By decree of the military directorate of the canton of Zurich it is forbidden until further notice to play on the military training area Allmend". In the age of mobile communications, a short-term postponement may not attract much attention. But at the end of the 19th century constant accessibility wasn't even wishful thinking. The following could be read about the game against FC Basel which was brought forward from the afternoon to the morning: “As a result, the Anglos, who were only partially able to notify their people, started the game with only seven men. Only during the course of the game was the team completed to the full eleven. There were also replacements in Basel's team, because some players did not arrive until a later train. The appointed referee was not there because he been scheduled for the afternoon. The crowd consisted of approximately 10 to 20 spectators. Under such circumstances, such an important match should not have been played." Despite all the obstacles: The game became a demonstration of the superiority of the British players from Zurich. The Anglo American Football Club won the match 10–0, with their center forward Robert Collinson alone scoring 8 goals. By then, at the latest, it was clear that the Anglos would be unstoppable on their way to the title.

Basel did not compete in the second edition of the official Swiss championship 1899–1900, but did in the 1900–01 Swiss Serie A. Thalmann scored his first league goal for his club in the away game on 4 November 1900. In fact, he scored two goals as Basel won 4–0 against local rivals Old Boys. Despite this good start to the new season, for the team the 1900–01 season was a bad season, they ended the group stage in fifth position. In this season, Thalmann played in all ten of the club's ten league matches. A curiosity in this season was the away game on 3 March 1901. This was an away game against Grasshopper Club and it ended in a 3–13 defeat. The reasons for this high defeat can be explained with the fact that one of the players missed the train and that the team played with a number of players from their reserve team. Nevertheless, to date this remains the team's highest and biggest defeat in the club's history.

Due to his studies at the university and then due to his personal profession, during the following seasons, Thalmann was unable to play regularly, only periodically. This changed during their 1906–07 season and he again played frequently. As it came to the last group game of the season, at home against the Old Boys, Basel were leading the table two points ahead of their opponents. However, in this last match despite a two-goal lead, the goals being scored by Dr. Siegfried Pfeiffer and Max Senn, their local rivals turned the game and won three goals to two. Subsequently, it came to a play-off to see who would advance to the finals. The play-off match was interrupted in the 50th minute due to a storm and following the restart it ended in a 1–1 draw. Thus, it required a reply one week later and this was also drawn 1–1. They played 2x 10 minutes extra time, but neither team scored. Therefore, both teams agreed to play a further 15 minutes, but again neither team scored. Another week later, it then came to a second replay which Basel decided quite clearly with 4–1 for themselves. Basel advanced to the finals for the first time in their history. The final was played as a round robin tournament. In the first match they were beaten 1–5 by west group winners Servette and in the second 2–3 by Young Fellows Zürich. Thalmann netted the only goal against Servette. Servette won the deciding match and became Swiss champions for the first time in their club's history.

Thalmann was a member of Basel's first team for 11 seasons. During this time, he played a total of 108 matches for the team and scored 19 goals. (Note: Scorers: many pre-First World War game sheets no longer exist or are incomplete and so, many line ups and most goal scorers in this period remain unknown.) 58 of these games were in the Swiss Series A and 50 were friendly games. He scored 11 goals in the domestic league, the other 10 were scored during the test games. He was also member of the FC Basel board of directors. Between 1900 and 1915 presided the club's board over a period of about ten years.

The Swiss Football Association (ASF-SFV) was formed in 1895 and was a founder member of FIFA in 1904. The following year the Switzerland national football team played their first official international match against France on 12 February 1905. Thalmann played his only international for the Swiss team in this match, which was played at the Parc des Princes in front of 500 supporters. France won the match 1–0 with the only goal coming from Gaston Cyprès.

== Biography ==
In 1902, Thalmann received his doctorate in Basel Dr. iur. In 1904, he was legal advisor and lawyer in Basel and was regarded as a specialist in property law and company law. He sat on the boards of Ciba, the Weyer Bank, the Lederimport AG, Rheinische Reinsurance, Tabakcompagnie AG and further companies and was a member of the Basel Chamber of Commerce.

Thalmann was a member of the Free Democratic Party of Switzerland. From 1911 to 1937, he held a seat in the Grand Council of Basel-Stadt. From 1928 to 1935, he represented his canton of residence in the Council of State. From 1929, he was president of the guardianship of the University of Basel.

As a private art collector, Thalmann was also commissioner of the Kunstmuseum Basel.

== Notes ==
=== Sources ===
- Rotblau: Jahrbuch Saison 2017/2018. Publisher: FC Basel Marketing AG. ISBN 978-3-7245-2189-1
- Die ersten 125 Jahre. Publisher: Josef Zindel im Friedrich Reinhardt Verlag, Basel. ISBN 978-3-7245-2305-5
- Verein "Basler Fussballarchiv" Homepage
- Ernst-Alfred Thalmann in the Historical Dictionary of Switzerland (in German)
