= Siegfried Pfeiffer =

Swiss footballer (1883-1959)

Personal information
- Full name: Siegfried Pfeiffer
- Date of birth: 19 October 1883
- Date of death: 15 February 1959 (aged 75)
- Position: Striker

Senior career*
Years	Team	Apps	(Gls)
1899–1908	FC Basel	32	(16)

International career
1908	Switzerland	1	(2)
- * Club domestic league appearances and goals

Dr Siegfried Pfeiffer (19 October 1883 – 15 February 1959) was a Swiss international footballer. He played mainly as striker, but also as midfielder.

Between the years 1899 und 1908 Pfeiffer played a total of 72 games for FC Basel scoring a total of 28 goals. He was also member of the FC Basel board of directors. He presided the club's board during the 1907–08 season.

He also played for the Swiss national team. On 5 April 1908 Pfeiffer scored two goals in the legendary 5–3 victory over Germany at the Landhof in Basel. This was the first national team game for the Germans.
