= 1897–98 FC Basel season =

FC Basel
1897–98 season
- Chairman: Charlie Volderauer
- First team coach: unknown
- Ground: Landhof, Basel
- Top goalscorer: n/a
- Average home league attendance: n/a

The FC Basel 1897–98 season was their fifth season since the club's foundation on 15 November 1893. The club's chairman was Charlie Volderauer and he was chairman between 1896 and 1900. He was the third chairman in the club's history, following Roland Geldner (1893–1896) and Emanuel Schiess (1896). FC Basel played their home games in the Landhof, in the Wettstein neighborhood of Kleinbasel (lesser Basel). The official Swiss championship had not yet been called to into life. Although this season a first, unofficial, competition was played, Basel did not compete.

== Overview ==
Although the first national championship in Switzerland took place in 1897–98 it is considered as unofficial because it was not organized by the Swiss Football Association (SFA; founded in 1895). FC Basel did not participate in this first championship, neither did local rivals Old Boys.

From a local point of view, there were also following clubs from Basel who played football. FC Play Fellows were founded in 1895, FC Excelsior founded 1896 and FC Kleinbasel founded at the beginning of 1898. The football team Buckjumpers-Club, founded 1894, dispanded themselves during 1897 and most players moved to FC Basel who then fielded a reserve team. FC Gymnasia, who were founded 1884 by Gymniasasten and real high school students was also dissolved. The RTV/Realschüler-Turnverein (real school student gymnastics club) had a football team from 1893 to 1898 from which the FC Old Boys emerged in 1894.

For this season FC Basel organised 10 friendly matches for their first team. Five were played at home in the Landhof and all five were won. Two friendlies were played in Zürich and both ended in high scoring defeats, 3–7 against Zürich and 0–7 against Grasshopper Club. The return game against local club Old Boys was drawn and the return game against Biel-Bienne was won 5–2. The friendly match against FC Bern was played on neutral ground in Aarau and Basel won this game 4–1. Of their 10 games Basel won seven, drew once and were defeated twice. The team scored 29 and conceded 20 goals. Much documentation for this season's matches are incomplete, therefore most goal scorers remain unknown.

== Players ==
Note: Flags indicate national team as defined under FIFA eligibility rules; some limited exceptions apply. Players may hold more than one non-FIFA nationality.

No.	Pos.	Nation	Player
—	GK	(Switzerland) SUI	Adolf Rittmann
—	DF	(Switzerland) SUI	Josy Ebinger
—	DF	(Switzerland) SUI	Charles Volderauer
—	FW	(Switzerland) SUI	Roland Geldner
—	FW	(Switzerland) SUI	Wilhelm Glaser
—	FW	(Switzerland) SUI	Emanuel Schiess
—	FW	(Switzerland) SUI	Hermann Schneider
—	FW	(Switzerland) SUI	Ernst-Alfred Thalmann I
—	FW	(Switzerland) SUI	Hans Billeter
—			Alfred Devick
—		(Switzerland) SUI	Georges Fürstenberger
—	DF	(Switzerland) SUI	Ernst Gass
—		(Switzerland) SUI	Louis Gürtler

No.	Pos.	Nation	Player
—		(Switzerland) SUI	Rudolf Iselin
—		(Switzerland) SUI	Rudolf La Roche
—		(Switzerland) SUI	Albert Linder
—		(Switzerland) SUI	? Lohn
—		(Switzerland) SUI	Hermann Matzinger
—		(Switzerland) SUI	Eric Mory
—			? Preiswerk
—	MF	(Switzerland) SUI	Otto Reber
—		(Switzerland) SUI	Rudolf Schwarz
—		(Switzerland) SUI	R. Sommer
—		(Switzerland) SUI	John Tollmann
—		(Switzerland) SUI	Roland Ziegler
—		(Switzerland) SUI	Walter Zürrer

== Results ==
=== Legend ===
Win Draw Loss

=== Friendly matches ===
==== Autumn ====
17 October 1897 Friendly	Zürich	7–3	Basel	Zürich
	(1:1); Enderli (2:1) (3:2); Meyer (4:3); Mädler (5:3); Wiederkehr (6:3); Wiederkehr (7:3)	Summary	(0:1) (2:2) H. Schneider (3:3)	Referee: (Switzerland) J. Suter, (FC Zürich)

24 October 1897 Friendly	Basel	7–0	Biel-Bienne	Landhof, Basel
	H. Schneider (1:0) (2:0) (3:0) (4:0) (5:0) (6:0) (7:0)	Summary

31 October 1897 Friendly	Basel	1–0	Old Boys	Landhof, Basel
	(1:0)	Summary		Referee: H. Burkhardt, (Basel)

7 November 1897 Friendly	Grasshopper Club	7–0	Basel	Zürich
	Goal	Summary

14 November 1897 Friendly	Basel	3–1	FC Excelsior Zürich	Landhof, Basel
	Goal	Summary	Goal	Referee: de Costa, (FC Basel)

==== Spring ====
13 March 1897 Friendly	Biel-Bienne	2–5	Basel	Biel/Bienne
	Dubois; Héritier	Summary	H. Schneider; H. Schneider; Thalmann I Thalmann I Billeter

27 March 1898 Friendly	Basel	3–1	Winterthur	Landhof, Basel
	Goal	Summary	Goal	Referee: Tollmann (FC Basel)

1 May 1898 Friendly	Old Boys	1–1	Basel	Stadion Schützenmatte, Basel
10:00	61' (1:1)	Summary	6' (0:1) H. Schneider	Referee: J. Enderli, (FC Zürich)

8 May 1898 Friendly	Basel	2–0	FC Fortuna Zürich	Landhof, Basel
14:30	Goal	Summary		Referee: Tollmann (FC Basel)

10 July 1898 Friendly	FC Bern	1–4	Basel	Aarau
	(1:1)	Summary	(o.g. 0:1) (1:2) (1:3) (1:4)	Referee: de Costa, (FC Basel)

== See also ==
- History of FC Basel
- List of FC Basel players
- List of FC Basel seasons

== Sources ==
- Rotblau: Jahrbuch Saison 2014/2015. Publisher: FC Basel Marketing AG. ISBN 978-3-7245-2027-6
- Die ersten 125 Jahre. Publisher: Josef Zindel im Friedrich Reinhardt Verlag, Basel. ISBN 978-3-7245-2305-5
- FCB squad 1897-1898 at fcb-archiv.ch

(NB: Despite all efforts, the editors of these books and the authors in "Basler Fussballarchiv" have failed to be able to identify all the players, their date and place of birth or date and place of death, who played in the games during the early years of FC Basel.)
