= 1899–1900 FC Basel season =

FC Basel
1899–1900 season
- Chairman: Charlie Volderauer (until 1899); Ernst-Alfred Thalmann (from 18 January 1900)
- First team coach: unknown
- Ground: Landhof, Basel

The FC Basel 1899–1900 season was their seventh season since the club's foundation on 15 November 1893. In this season they did not compete for the Swiss championship. The club's chairman was Charlie Volderauer, who was chairman between 1896 and 1900. He stood down at the AGM and Ernst-Alfred Thalmann was elected as the new club chairman. FC Basel played their home games in the Landhof, in the Quarter Kleinbasel.

== Overview ==
The first national championship in Switzerland took place in 1897–98. This championship is considered as unofficial because it was not organized by the Swiss Football Association (SFA; founded in 1895). FC Basel did not participate in this first championship. But they did in the second edition during the last season. Basel did not compete in the championship this season either. But they have participated in every season since.

Georges Fürstenberger was appointed as team captain by the club's board of directors under chairman Charlie Volderauer. As captain Fürstenberger led the team trainings and was responsible for the line-ups. Basel played 16 friendly games in the season, six were won, two drawn and eight ended with a defeat. The team scored 31 goals, but only seven goal scorers are documented, and they conceded 37 goals.

Eleven of these friendly games were played at home in the Landhof, five were played away. As in the previous season, all the friendly games were played against Swiss teams. Among the opponents were reigning Swiss champions Anglo-American Club Zürich and Basel won both the home game and the return match. They also played twice against Zürich, but both games ended with a defeat. Further there were two games against local rivals Old Boys and these were both lost as well. The two games against FC Concordia Zürich ended with a win at home but a defeat away. The two games against Biel-Bienne ended with a home defeat, but an away win.

== Players ==
Note: Flags indicate national team as defined under FIFA eligibility rules; some limited exceptions apply. Players may hold more than one non-FIFA nationality.

No.	Pos.	Nation	Player
—	GK	(Switzerland) SUI	Paul Hofer
—	GK	(Switzerland) SUI	Jules Fingerlin
—	DF	(Switzerland) SUI	Josy Ebinger
—	DF	(Switzerland) SUI	Daniel Hug
—	MF	(Switzerland) SUI	Alphonse Schorpp
—	FW	(Switzerland) SUI	Dr. Siegfried Pfeiffer
—	FW	(Switzerland) SUI	Emanuel Schiess
—	FW	(Switzerland) SUI	Hermann Schneider
—	MF	(Switzerland) SUI	Ernst-Alfred Thalmann I
—	FW	(Switzerland) SUI	Hans Billeter
—		(Switzerland) SUI	Georges Fürstenberger (captain)
—		(Switzerland) SUI	Gass I

No.	Pos.	Nation	Player
—		(Switzerland) SUI	Ernst Gass II
—		(France) FRA	Jules Gérard
—	FW	(Switzerland) SUI	Rudolf Gossweiler
—		(Switzerland) SUI	Edmond Racle
—	MF	(Switzerland) SUI	Otto Reber
—	FW	(Switzerland) SUI	Karl Schneider
—		(Switzerland) SUI	Rudolf Schwarz
—		(Switzerland) SUI	Schweizer II
—		(Switzerland) SUI	Albert Sevin
—	MF	(Switzerland) SUI	R. Sommer
—	MF	(Switzerland) SUI	Stutz II
—		(Switzerland) SUI	Paul Thalmann III
—		(Switzerland) SUI	Max Zutt

Players who left the squad

Note: Flags indicate national team as defined under FIFA eligibility rules; some limited exceptions apply. Players may hold more than one non-FIFA nationality.

No.	Pos.	Nation	Player
—	DF	(Switzerland) SUI	Ferdinand Isler
—	DF	(Switzerland) SUI	Charles Volderauer
—	FW		L. Montbaron
—		(Switzerland) SUI	Louis Gürtler

No.	Pos.	Nation	Player
—		(Switzerland) SUI	Alfred Iselin
—		(Switzerland) SUI	Rudolf Iselin
—		(Switzerland) SUI	Rudolf La Roche
—			Horace Watts
—		(Switzerland) SUI	Roland Ziegler

== Results ==
Legend

Win Draw Loss

=== Friendly matches ===
==== Early season ====
8 October 1899 Friendly	Basel	0–4	FC Fortuna Zürich	Landhof, Basel
		Summary	(0:1) (0:2) (0:3) (0:4)

12 November 1899 Friendly	Basel	3–1	FC Concordia Zürich	Landhof, Basel
	Goal	Summary	Goal

19 November 1899 Friendly	Basel	4–2	Anglo-American Club Zürich	Landhof, Basel
	Goal	Summary	Goal

26 November 1899 Friendly	Basel	2–2	FC Neuchâtel	Landhof, Basel
	Goal	Summary	Goal

3 December 1899 Friendly	Zürich	5–1	Basel	Zürich
	Goal	Summary	Goal

==== Spring ====
21 January 1900 Friendly	Old Boys	3–1	Basel	Stadion Schützenmatte, Basel
	Mory 10' (1:1); Schwarz 75' (2:1); Mory 85' (3:1)	Summary	5' (0:1) Thalmann I	Referee: E. Engelke, (Anglo-American Club Zürich)

4 February 1900 Friendly	Basel	3–1	FC Fortuna Basel	Landhof, Basel
	Goal	Summary	Goal

11 February 1900 Friendly	Anglo-American Club Zürich	2–3	Basel	Allmend Brunau, Zürich
15:45	Suarès (I) 35' (1:0); Suarès (I) (2:3)	Summary	(1:1) (1:2) (1:3)

18 February 1900 Friendly	Basel	0–1	Old Boys	Landhof, Basel
14:45		Summary	50' (0:1) Schwarz	Referee: H. Studer, (Old Boys)

25 February 1900 Friendly	Basel	0–3	FC Neuchâtel	Landhof, Basel
14:30		Summary	(0:1) L. Billeter (0:2) Salvadé (0:3)	Referee: Joe C. Devick, (Old Boys)

11 March 1900 Friendly	Basel	0–2	Biel-Bienne	Landhof, Basel
		Summary	(0:1) Frey (0:2) Hiltbrand	Referee: H. Banga, (Old Boys)

18 March 1900 Friendly	Biel-Bienne	0–2	Basel	Gurzelen Stadion, Biel/Bienne
		Summary	(0:1) (0:2)
Note: The game was abandoned 20 minutes before the end of the game due to two serious injuries in the FC Basel team.

1 April 1900 Friendly	Basel	6–0	FC Kleinbasel	Landhof, Basel
	(1:0) (2:0) (3:0) (4:0) (5:0) (6:0)	Summary

15 April 1900 Friendly	Basel	4–5	Zürich	Landhof, Basel
15:00	Pfeiffer (1:0); Schiess (2:3); Pfeiffer (3:5); H. Schneider (4:5)	Summary	(1:1) (1:2) (1:3) (2:4) (2:5)

22 April 1900 Friendly	Basel	1–1	FC Fortuna Basel	Landhof, Basel
	Goal	Summary	Goal

6 May 1900 Friendly	FC Concordia Zürich	5–1	Basel
	Goal	Summary	Goal

== Sources ==
- Rotblau: Jahrbuch Saison 2014/2015. Publisher: FC Basel Marketing AG. ISBN 978-3-7245-2027-6
- Die ersten 125 Jahre. Publisher: Josef Zindel im Friedrich Reinhardt Verlag, Basel. ISBN 978-3-7245-2305-5
- FCB squad 1899-1900 at fcb-archiv.ch

(NB: Despite all efforts, the editors of these books and the authors in "Basler Fussballarchiv" have failed to be able to identify all the players, their date and place of birth or date and place of death, who played in the games during the early years of FC Basel. Much documentation for this season is missing, most goal scorers remain unknown.)
