= 1896–97 FC Basel season =

FC Basel
1896–97 season
- Chairman: Charlie Volderauer
- First team coach: Charlie Volderauer (as team captain)
- Ground: Landhof, Basel
- Top goalscorer: n/a
- Average home league attendance: n/a

The FC Basel 1896–97 season was their fourth season since the club's foundation on 15 November 1893. Emanuel Schiess was the club's chairman, but he stood down at the club's AGM and Charlie Volderauer was elected as new chairman. He was the club's third chairman in their history, following Roland Geldner (1893–1896) and Schiess. FC Basel played their home games in the Landhof, in the Wettstein neighborhood of Kleinbasel (lesser Basel). The Swiss national championships had not yet been called to into life.

== Overview ==
The idea of a Swiss national championship came to review with the Swiss Football Association, that had been founded the previous year and of which Basel and local rivals Old Boys were a member. But such a championship had not yet been called to into life.

The club chairman Charlie Volderauer was the team captain this season. For this season club organised seven friendly matches for their first team. Four of these matches were held in Basel, one in the Landhof, two on the Schützenmatte and from the fourth the place of playing field is uncertain. Basel played two games in Mulhouse. The first against Strassburger FV was lost 3–4 and the second against FC Mulhouse was lost 2–3. Five games were played in November/December and the other two in March and June. Of the seven games, two were won, two were drawn and the team suffered three defeats. The team scored 16 and conceded nine goals.

== Players ==
Note: Flags indicate national team as defined under FIFA eligibility rules; some limited exceptions apply. Players may hold more than one non-FIFA nationality.

No.	Pos.	Nation	Player
—	GK	(Switzerland) SUI	Adolf Rittmann
—	DF	(Switzerland) SUI	Josy Ebinger
—	DF	(Switzerland) SUI	Charles Volderauer
—	FW	(Switzerland) SUI	Roland Geldner
—	FW	(Switzerland) SUI	Emanuel Schiess
—	FW	(Switzerland) SUI	Hermann Schneider
—	FW	(England) ENG	Rudolf Bax
—			Alfred Devick
—		(Switzerland) SUI	Joan Gamper
—		(Switzerland) SUI	Fritz Gürtler

No.	Pos.	Nation	Player
—		(Switzerland) SUI	Louis Gürtler
—		(Switzerland) SUI	Rudolf Iselin
—		(Switzerland) SUI	Hans Koch
—		(Switzerland) SUI	Albert Linder
—		(Switzerland) SUI	Eric Mory
—		(Switzerland) SUI	Paul Preiswerk
—		(Switzerland) SUI	Gustav Schwarz
—		(Switzerland) SUI	Rudolf Schwarz
—		(Switzerland) SUI	R. Sommer
—		(Switzerland) SUI	John Tollmann
—		(Switzerland) SUI	R. C. Vanorden

== Results ==
=== Legend ===
Win Draw Loss

=== Friendly matches ===
==== Autumn ====
8 November 1896 Friendly	Basel	1 – 2	Grasshopper Club	Landhof, Basel
	Goal	Summary	Goal

15 November 1896 Friendly	Strassburger FV	4 – 3	Basel	Mulhouse
15:30	Goal	Summary	Goal

22 November 1896 Friendly	FC Mulhouse	3 – 2	Basel	Mulhouse
	Goal	Summary	Goal

29 November 1896 Friendly	Basel	1 – 0	Zürich	Stadion Schützenmatte, Basel
	(1:0)	Summary		Referee: Charlie Volderauer, Basel

6 December 1896 Friendly	Basel	9 – 0	FC Bern	Stadion Schützenmatte, Basel
	(1:0) (2:0) (3:0) (4:0) (5:0) (6:0) (7:0) (8:0) (9:0)	Summary

==== Spring ====
28 March 1897 Friendly	Basel	0 – 0	Old Boys	Basel
		Summary

13 June 1897 Friendly	FC Bern	0 – 0	Basel	Kasernenmatte, Bern
		Summary

== See also ==
- History of FC Basel
- List of FC Basel players
- List of FC Basel seasons

== Sources ==
- Rotblau: Jahrbuch Saison 2014/2015. Publisher: FC Basel Marketing AG. ISBN 978-3-7245-2027-6
- Die ersten 125 Jahre. Publisher: Josef Zindel im Friedrich Reinhardt Verlag, Basel. ISBN 978-3-7245-2305-5
- FCB squad 1896–1897 at fcb-archiv.ch

(NB: Despite all efforts, the editors of these books and the authors in "Basler Fussballarchiv" have failed to be able to identify all the players, their date and place of birth or date and place of death, who played in the games during the early years of FC Basel.)
