= 1898–99 FC Basel season =

FC Basel
1898–99 season
- Chairman: Charlie Volderauer
- First team coach: Hermann Schneider (as team captain)
- Ground: Landhof, Basel
- Serie A: Eliminated 1st round
- Top goalscorer: Emanuel Schiess (2 goals)
- Average home league attendance: n/a

The FC Basel 1898–99 season was their sixth season since the club's foundation on 15 November 1893. This was the first season in which they competed for the Swiss championship. The club's chairman was Charlie Volderauer, who was chairman between 1896 and 1900. He was the third chairman in the club's history, following Roland Geldner (1893–1896) and Emanuel Schiess (1896). FC Basel played their home games in the Landhof, in the Quarter Kleinbasel.

== Overview ==
In the early years of the Basel first team the club did not have a trainer or coach. The work of leading the team trainings and the responsibility of choosing the player line-ups was done by the team captain. Hermann Schneider was appointed as team captain for this season by the club's board of directors under club chairman Charlie Volderauer. The team played four friendly matches in the first half of the season and three after the new year. Three of the games were played at home and four were played away. Four of the friendlies ended with a victory and three ended with a defeat. The team scored 11 goals in these friendlies, but conceded 23. (Note: Scorers: many pre-First World War game sheets no longer exist or are incomplete and so, many line ups and most goal scorers in this period remain unknown.)

Although the first national championship in Switzerland took place in 1897–98 it is considered as unofficial because it was not organized by the Swiss Football Association (SFA; founded in 1895). FC Basel did not participate in the first unofficial championship, but did in the first official edition during this season 1898–99. The club did not compete in the following season either, but have participated in every season since 1900–01.

The 1898–99 championship was played as a knock out competition, divided into three regional groups, an east (region Zürich), a central (regional north-west Switzerland) and west group (Romandy). The winners of each group played the finals in a round-robin tournament. Basel played in the central group against Old Boys. Because the game was drawn, one goal each, it required a replay. This was also drawn, despite an agreed two times 20 minutes extra time. Because the Old Boys then complained that the first FCB goal had been scored by hand they protested and the SFA had to deal with the matter. Subsequently, the protest was approved and awarded - and the disputed goal was simply deducted from the score to give the final result. Thus the Old Boys became the first forfait winners in Swiss football history. The Old Boys advanced to the finals, but the Anglo-American Club Zürich became Swiss champions.

A curiosity in this season was the game in Zürich on 5 March 1899. The majority of them English students, had formed a club and the members of the Anglo-American Club even attended the founder meeting of the Swiss Football Association (ASF-SFV) in April 1895. They had found a place to play their games, although the Zurich commons was by no means ideal. It was often that the players found the grounds very sludgy or with freshly raised molehills. But at least, it was a homestead that was soon called "Anglo-Platz". Suddenly the announcement: "By decree of the military directorate of the canton of Zurich it is forbidden until further notice to play on the military training area Allmend". In the age of mobile communications, a short-term postponement may not attract much attention. But at the end of the 19th century constant accessibility wasn't even wishful thinking. The following could be read about the game against FC Basel which was brought forward from the afternoon to the morning: "As a result, the Anglos, who were only partially able to notify their people, started the game with only seven men. Only during the course of the game was the team completed to the full eleven. There were also replacements in Basel's team, because some players did not arrive until a later train. The appointed referee was not there because he been scheduled for the afternoon. The crowd consisted of approximately 10 to 20 spectators. Under such circumstances, such an important match should not have been played." Despite all the obstacles: The game became a demonstration of the superiority of the British players from Zurich. The Anglo American Football Club won the match 10–0, with their center forward Robert Collinson alone scoring 8 goals. By then, at the latest, it was clear that the Anglos would be unstoppable on their way to the title.

== Players ==
Note: Flags indicate national team as defined under FIFA eligibility rules; some limited exceptions apply. Players may hold more than one non-FIFA nationality.

No.	Pos.	Nation	Player
—	GK	SUI	Paul Hofer
—	GK	SUI	Adolf Rittmann
—	DF	SUI	Charles Volderauer
—	FW	SUI	Emanuel Schiess
—	FW	SUI	Hermann Schneider (team captain)
—	MF	SUI	Ernst-Alfred Thalmann I
—	FW	SUI	Hans Billeter
—		SUI	Georges Fürstenberger
—	DF	SUI	Ernst Gass
—		SUI	Louis Gürtler
—			Alfred Iselin

No.	Pos.	Nation	Player
—		SUI	Rudolf Iselin
—		SUI	Rudolf La Roche
—	FW		L. Montbaron
—	MF	SUI	Otto Reber
—		SUI	Rudolf Schwarz
—	MF	SUI	R. Sommer
—			Horace Watts
—		SUI	Roland Ziegler
—	DF	SUI	Ferdinand Isler
—	FW	SUI	Karl Schneider
—		FRA	Jules Gérard
—		SUI	Edmond Racle

== Results ==
=== Legend ===
Win Draw Loss

=== Friendly matches ===
2 October 1898 Friendly	Basel	2 – 0	Stade Genevois	Landhof, Basel
	Schiess (1:0); H. Schneider (2:0)	Summary
Note: Stade Genevois was a Geneva selection and with them Fredy Gamper from FC Zurich played in this game.

23 October 1898 Friendly	FC Bern	1 – 5	Basel	Aarau
	Müller (1:1)	Summary	(0:1) Schiess (1:2) H. Schneider (1:3) (1:4) (1:5)	Referee: de Costa, FC Basel

6 November 1898 Friendly	Basel	0 – 4	Grasshopper Club	Landhof, Basel
15:00		Summary	60' (0:4) (pen. 0:2) Schmid (0:3) Huguenin; 80' (0:4) Schmid	Referee: Alliston, FC Mulhouse

20 November 1898 Friendly	Winterthur	0 – 1	Basel	Schützenwiese, Winterthur
		Summary	(0:1) Thalmann I	Referee: J. Enderli, FC Zürich

22 January 1899 Friendly	Grasshopper Club	7 – 0	Basel	Zürich
	Goal	Summary

12 February 1899 Friendly	Basel	3 – 1	Zürich	Landhof, Basel
	Thalmann I (1:0); Thalmann I (2:0); Schiess (3:0)	Summary

5 March 1899 Friendly	Anglo-American Club Zürich	10 – 0	Basel	Allmend, Zürich
	Collinson (1:0); Collinson (2:0) (3:0); Collinson (4:0); Collinson (5:0); Collinson (6:0) (7:0); Collinson (8:0); Collinson (9:0); Collinson (10:0)	Summary		Referee: Machwürth, Zürich

=== Serie A ===
==== Central group ====
13 November 1898 1st round	Basel	1 – 1	Old Boys	Landhof, Basel
15:00	Schiess (1:1)	Summary	4' (0:1) Weber	Referee: de Costa

18 December 1898 replay	Old Boys	2 – 2 (a.e.t.)	Basel	Stadion Schützenmatte, Basel
14:30	Devick 40' (pen.); Buser 65'	Summary	10' La Roche; 80' Schiess	Referee: (Switzerland) Doll
Note: Old Boys protest. Score amended to 2–1

NB: Old Boys win 2–1 after protesting to the SFA. The first goal FCB goal was struck out of the result.

== See also ==
- History of FC Basel
- List of FC Basel players
- List of FC Basel seasons

== Notes ==
=== Sources ===
- Rotblau: Jahrbuch Saison 2014/2015. Publisher: FC Basel Marketing AG. ISBN 978-3-7245-2027-6
- Die ersten 125 Jahre. Publisher: Josef Zindel im Friedrich Reinhardt Verlag, Basel. ISBN 978-3-7245-2305-5
- Switzerland 1898-99 at RSSSF

(NB: Despite all efforts, the editors of these books and the authors in "Basler Fussballarchiv" have failed to be able to identify all the players, their date and place of birth or date and place of death, who played in the games during the early years of FC Basel.)
