= Ernst Gass =

Swiss footballer (born 1883)

Personal information
- Full name: Ernst Friedrich Gass
- Date of birth: 27 April 1883
- Place of birth: Switzerland
- Date of death: unknown
- Position: Midfielder

Senior career*
Years	Team	Apps	(Gls)
1897–1900	FC Basel	2	(0)
- * Club domestic league appearances and goals

Ernst Gass (born 27 April 1883) was a Swiss footballer who played as midfielder in the late 1890s.

== Football career ==
Gass joined FC Basel's first team during their 1897–98 season. The official Swiss national championship had not yet been called into life and so the team played only friendly games. Gass played his first game for the club in the friendly away game on 13 March 1898 as Basel won 5–2 against Biel-Bienne. Schwarz played in all ten of the club's friendly games that season.

The first edition of the official Swiss championship season 1898–99 was played as a knock out competition, divided into three regional groups, an east (region Zürich), a central (regional north-west Switzerland) and west group (Romandy). The winners of each group played the finals in a round-robin tournament. Gass played his league debut for the club in this home game at the Landhof on 13 November 1898. Because the game was drawn, one goal each, it required a replay. This replay was held in the Stadion Schützenmatte on 18 December 1898. This was also drawn 2–2, despite an agreed 2x 20 minutes extra time. Because the Old Boys complained that the first FCB goal scored by Rudolf La Roche in the 10th minute had been scored by hand, they protested and the ASF-SFV had to deal with the matter. Subsequently, the protest was approved and the game awarded - and the disputed goal was simply deducted from the score to give the final result. Thus the Old Boys became the first forfeit winners in Swiss football history and Basel were knocked out of the competition. The Old Boys advanced to the finals, but the Anglo-American Club Zürich became Swiss champions.

A curiosity in their 1898–99 season was the friendly game in Zürich on 5 March 1899. The majority of them English students, had formed a club and the members of the Anglo-American Club even attended the founder meeting of the Swiss Football Association (ASF-SFV) in April 1895. They had found a place to play their games, although the Zurich commons was by no means ideal. It was often that the players found the grounds very sludgy or with freshly raised molehills. But at least, it was a homestead that was soon called "Anglo-Platz". Suddenly the announcement: "By decree of the military directorate of the canton of Zurich it is forbidden until further notice to play on the military training area Allmend". In the age of mobile communications, a short-term postponement may not attract much attention. But at the end of the 19th century constant accessibility wasn't even wishful thinking. The following could be read about the game against FC Basel which was brought forward from the afternoon to the morning: “As a result, the Anglos, who were only partially able to notify their people, started the game with only seven men. Only during the course of the game was the team completed to the full eleven. There were also replacements in Basel's team, because some players did not arrive until a later train. The appointed referee was not there because he been scheduled for the afternoon. The crowd consisted of approximately 10 to 20 spectators. Under such circumstances, such an important match should not have been played." Despite all the obstacles: The game became a demonstration of the superiority of the British players from Zurich. The Anglo American Football Club won the match 10–0, with their center forward Robert Collinson alone scoring 8 goals. By then, at the latest, it was clear that the Anglos would be unstoppable on their way to the title.

In their following season Basel did not compete in the 1899–1900 Swiss Serie A, but contested 16 friendly matches. In his three seasons with the club Gass played at least 16 games for Basel without scoring a goal. (Note: Many pre-First World War game sheets no longer exist or are incomplete. So, some line-ups and most goal scorers in this period remain unknown.) Two of these games were in the Swiss Serie A and the others were friendly games.

== Notes ==
=== Sources ===
- Rotblau: Jahrbuch Saison 2017/2018. Publisher: FC Basel Marketing AG. ISBN 978-3-7245-2189-1
- Die ersten 125 Jahre. Publisher: Josef Zindel im Friedrich Reinhardt Verlag, Basel. ISBN 978-3-7245-2305-5
- Verein "Basler Fussballarchiv" Homepage

(NB: Despite all efforts, the editors of these books and the authors in "Basler Fussballarchiv" have failed to be able to identify all the players, their date and place of birth or date and place of death, who played in the games during the early years of FC Basel)
