= Paul Hofer (footballer) =

Swiss footballer (born 1881)

Personal information
- Full name: Paul Hofer
- Date of birth: 7 September 1881
- Place of birth: Switzerland
- Positions: Goalkeeper; defender

Senior career*
Years	Team	Apps	(Gls)
1898–1905	FC Basel	27	(0)
- * Club domestic league appearances and goals

Paul Hofer (born 7 September 1881; date of death unknown) was a Swiss footballer who played in the late 1890s and early 1900s.

Hofer joined FC Basel's first team for their 1898–99 season.

The first edition of the official Swiss championship was played in the 1898–99 season as a knock out competition. Basel played against Old Boys in the central group semi-final. Hofer played his domestic league debut in this home game at the Landhof on 13 November 1898 as Basel played a 1–1 draw with their local rivals.

It therefore required a replay. This replay was in the Stadion Schützenmatte on 18 December 1898 and was also drawn 2–2, despite an agreed two times 20 minutes extra time. Because the Old Boys complained that the first FCB goal, scored by Rudolf La Roche in the 10th minute, had been scored by hand, they protested and the Swiss Football Association (SFA) had to deal with the matter. Subsequently, the protest was approved and awarded - and the disputed goal was simply deducted from the score to give the final result. Thus the Old Boys became the first forfait winners in Swiss football history. The Old Boys advanced to the finals, but the Anglo-American Club Zürich became Swiss champions.

A curiosity in this 1898–99 season was the game in Zürich on 5 March 1899. The majority of them English students, had formed a club and the members of the Anglo-American Club even attended the founder meeting of the Swiss Football Association (ASF-SFV) in April 1895. They had found a place to play their games, although the Zurich commons was by no means ideal. It was often that the players found the grounds very sludgy or with freshly raised molehills. But at least, it was a homestead that was soon called "Anglo-Platz". Suddenly the announcement: "By decree of the military directorate of the canton of Zurich it is forbidden until further notice to play on the military training area Allmend". In the age of mobile communications, a short-term postponement may not attract much attention. But at the end of the 19th century constant accessibility wasn't even wishful thinking. The following could be read about the game against FC Basel which was brought forward from the afternoon to the morning: “As a result, the Anglos, who were only partially able to notify their people, started the game with only seven men. Only during the course of the game was the team completed to the full eleven. There were also replacements in Basel's team, because some players did not arrive until a later train. The appointed referee was not there because he been scheduled for the afternoon. The crowd consisted of approximately 10 to 20 spectators. Under such circumstances, such an important match should not have been played." Despite all the obstacles: The game became a demonstration of the superiority of the British players from Zurich. The Anglo American Football Club won the match 10–0, with their center forward Robert Collinson alone scoring 8 goals. By then, at the latest, it was clear that the Anglos would be unstoppable on their way to the title.

For the team the 1900–01 season was a bad season, they ended the season in fifth position in the group stage. A curiosity in this season was the away game on 3 March 1901. This was an away game against Grasshopper Club and it ended in a 3–13 defeat. The reasons for this high defeat can be explained with the fact that one of the players missed the train and that the team played with a number of players from their reserve team. Nevertheless, to date this remains the teams’ highest and biggest defeat in the club's history.

Between the years 1898 and 1905 Hofer played a total of 56 games for Basel. He mainly played as the goalkeeper, but he also played out in the field as a defender. 27 of these games were in the Swiss Serie A and 29 were friendly games

== Sources ==
- Rotblau: Jahrbuch Saison 2017/2018. Publisher: FC Basel Marketing AG. ISBN 978-3-7245-2189-1
- Die ersten 125 Jahre. Publisher: Josef Zindel im Friedrich Reinhardt Verlag, Basel. ISBN 978-3-7245-2305-5
- Verein "Basler Fussballarchiv" Homepage

(NB: Despite all efforts, the editors of these books and the authors in "Basler Fussballarchiv" have failed to be able to identify all the players, their date and place of birth or date and place of death, who played in the games during the early years of FC Basel.)
