= Adolf Rittmann =

Swiss footballer (1876–1914)

Personal information
- Full name: Adolf Rittmann
- Date of birth: 8 June 1876
- Place of birth: Switzerland
- Date of death: 1914 (aged 37–38)
- Positions: Goalkeeper; forward

Senior career*
Years	Team	Apps	(Gls)
1894–1899	FC Basel	2	(0)
- * Club domestic league appearances and goals

Adolf Rittmann (8 June 1876 – 1914) was a Swiss footballer who played mainly as goalkeeper and sometimes as forward in the 1890s.

== Football career ==
Rittmann joined FC Basel's first team for their 1894–95 season. The official Swiss national championship had not yet been called into life and so the team played only friendly games. Rittmann played his first game for the club in the home game on 14 October 1894 as Basel 0–0 draw with the RTV/Realschüler-Turnverein (secondary school student gymnastics club). Rittmann played in six of the club's 12 friendly games that season.

The first edition of the official Swiss championship was played in the 1898–99 season as a knock out competition. Basel played against Old Boys in the central group semi-final. Rittmann played his league debut for the club in this home game at the Landhof on 13 November 1898. It ended in 1–1 draw with their local rivals. It therefore required a replay. This replay was held in the Stadion Schützenmatte on 18 December 1898. This was also drawn 2–2, despite an agreed 2x 20 minutes extra time. Because the Old Boys complained that the first FCB goal scored by Rudolf La Roche in the 10th minute had been scored by hand, they protested and the ASF-SFV had to deal with the matter. Subsequently, the protest was approved and the game awarded - and the disputed goal was simply deducted from the score to give the final result. Thus the Old Boys became the first forfait winners in Swiss football history and Basel were knocked out of the competition. The Old Boys advanced to the finals, but the Anglo-American Club Zürich became Swiss champions.

A curiosity in their 1898–99 season was the friendly game in Zürich on 5 March 1899. The majority of them English students, had formed a club and the members of the Anglo-American Club even attended the founder meeting of the Swiss Football Association (ASF-SFV) in April 1895. They had found a place to play their games, although the Zurich commons was by no means ideal. It was often that the players found the grounds very sludgy or with freshly raised molehills. But at least, it was a homestead that was soon called "Anglo-Platz". Suddenly the announcement: "By decree of the military directorate of the canton of Zurich it is forbidden until further notice to play on the military training area Allmend". In the age of mobile communications, a short-term postponement may not attract much attention. But at the end of the 19th century constant accessibility wasn't even wishful thinking. The following could be read about the game against FC Basel which was brought forward from the afternoon to the morning: “As a result, the Anglos, who were only partially able to notify their people, started the game with only seven men. Only during the course of the game was the team completed to the full eleven. There were also replacements in Basel's team, because some players did not arrive until a later train. The appointed referee was not there because he been scheduled for the afternoon. The crowd consisted of approximately 10 to 20 spectators. Under such circumstances, such an important match should not have been played." Despite all the obstacles: The game became a demonstration of the superiority of the British players from Zurich. The Anglo American Football Club won the match 10–0, with their center forward Robert Collinson alone scoring 8 goals. By then, at the latest, it was clear that the Anglos would be unstoppable on their way to the title.

In his five seasons with the club Rittmann appeared in at least 28 games for Basel without scoring a goal. (Note: Many pre-First World War game sheets no longer exist or are incomplete. So, some line-ups and most goal scorers in this period remain unknown.) Two of these games were in the Swiss Serie A and the other 26 appearances were in friendly games.

== Notes ==
=== Sources ===
- Rotblau: Jahrbuch Saison 2017/2018. Publisher: FC Basel Marketing AG. ISBN 978-3-7245-2189-1
- Die ersten 125 Jahre. Publisher: Josef Zindel im Friedrich Reinhardt Verlag, Basel. ISBN 978-3-7245-2305-5
- Verein "Basler Fussballarchiv" Homepage

(NB: Despite all efforts, the editors of these books and the authors in "Basler Fussballarchiv" have failed to be able to identify all the players, their date and place of birth or date and place of death, who played in the games during the early years of FC Basel)
