= Alfred Devick =

Swiss footballer (1881-1932)

Personal information
- Full name: Alfred H. Devick
- Date of birth: 29 June 1881
- Date of death: 1932
- Positions: Defender; midfielder

Senior career*
Years	Team	Apps	(Gls)
1896–1898	FC Basel	(Note: League: up until 1898 there was no league football in Switzerland.)	
1898–1901	BSC Old Boys	5+	(0)
- * Club domestic league appearances and goals

Alfred H. Devick (born 29 June 1881 – 1932) was a Swiss footballer who played as defender or as midfielder in the 1890s and early 1900s.

== Football career ==
FC Basel was founded on 15 November 1893 and Devick joined the club about three years later, during their 1896–97 season. Devick played his first game for the club in the away game on 13 June 1897 as Basel played a 1–1 draw with FC Bern. He scored his first goal for his club on 14 November 1897 in the home game in the Landhof as Basel won 3–1 against FC Excelsior Zürich.

Devick stayed with the club for two season and he played eight games for Basel scoring at least that one goal. (Note: Scorers: many pre-First World War game sheets no longer exist or are incomplete and so, many line ups and most goal scorers in this period remain unknown.)

Following his time with Basel, Devick moved on to play for BSC Old Boys. The first edition of the official Swiss championship was played in the 1898–99 season as a knock out competition. The Old Boys played against Basel in the central group semi-final and Devick played his domestic league debut in this away game at the Landhof on 13 November 1898. The Old Boys played a 1–1 draw with their local rivals. It therefore required a replay. Devick also played in this replay, which was held on the Old Boys playing fields, Stadion Schützenmatte on 18 December 1898 and was also drawn 2–2. Despite an agreed two times 20 minutes extra time the score remained. Because the Old Boys complained that the first FCB goal, scored by Rudolf La Roche in the 10th minute, had been scored by hand, they protested and the Swiss Football Association (SFA) had to deal with the matter. Subsequently, the protest was approved and the game awarded - and the disputed goal was simply deducted from the score to give the final result. Thus the Old Boys became the first forfait winners in Swiss football history.

The Old Boys advanced to the finals and here they should have played the first match against Lausanne Football and Cricket Club, but the British players of Lausanne refused to play on a Sunday. The SFA awarded the game forfait. Devick played in the final, but the Anglo-American Club Zürich won the game 7–0 and became the first official Swiss champions.

Devick remained with Old Boys at least two more seasons.

== Notes ==
=== Sources ===
- Rotblau: Jahrbuch Saison 2017/2018. Publisher: FC Basel Marketing AG. ISBN 978-3-7245-2189-1
- Die ersten 125 Jahre. Publisher: Josef Zindel im Friedrich Reinhardt Verlag, Basel. ISBN 978-3-7245-2305-5
- Verein "Basler Fussballarchiv" Homepage
