= Emanuel Schiess =

Swiss footballer (1875-1948)

Personal information
- Full name: Georg Emanuel Schiess
- Date of birth: 6 July 1875
- Place of birth: Basel
- Date of death: 13 May 1948 (aged 72)
- Place of death: Basel
- Position: Striker

Senior career*
Years	Team	Apps	(Gls)
1893–1902	FC Basel	17	(4)
- * Club domestic league appearances and goals

Dr Georg Emanuel Schiess (* 6 July 1875 in Basel; † 13 May 1948 in Basel) was a Swiss footballer who played for FC Basel. He played mainly as forward, but also as midfielder.

== Football career ==
Schiess joined Basel a few weeks after the club's foundation during their 1893–94 season. Team mate Charles Volderauer, as businessman, had good connections and used them from the very beginning. As early as June 1894, Volderauer organised the journey to visit Strassburger FV. Schiess travelled with the team by train to Strasbourg and played their first match against a foreign team, which ended with a 0–8 defeat.

In the following season, Schiess scored his first goal for his club in the Stadion Schützenmatte on 2 December 1894. In fact he scored the first four goals of the game as Basel won 5–0 against FC Mulhouse.

The first official Swiss championship season 1898–99 was played as a knock out competition, divided into three regional groups, an east (region Zürich), a central (regional north-west Switzerland) and west group (Romandy). The winners of each group played the finals in a round-robin tournament. Basel played in the central group semi-final against Old Boys. Because the game was drawn, one goal each, it required a replay. This replay was held in the Stadion Schützenmatte on 18 December 1898. Schiess played in both games and this replay was also drawn 2–2, despite an agreed 2x 20 minutes extra time. Because the Old Boys complained that the first FCB goal scored by Rudolf La Roche in the 10th minute had been scored by hand, they protested and the ASF-SFV had to deal with the matter. Subsequently, the protest was approved and the game awarded - and the disputed goal was simply deducted from the score to give the final result. Thus the Old Boys became the first forfait winners in Swiss football history and Basel were knocked out of the competition. The Old Boys advanced to the finals, but the Anglo-American Club Zürich became Swiss champions.

A curiosity in their 1898–99 season was the friendly game in Zürich on 5 March 1899. The majority of them English students, had formed a club and the members of the Anglo-American Club even attended the founder meeting of the Swiss Football Association (ASF-SFV) in April 1895. They had found a place to play their games, although the Zurich commons was by no means ideal. It was often that the players found the grounds very sludgy or with freshly raised molehills. But at least, it was a homestead that was soon called "Anglo-Platz". Suddenly the announcement: "By decree of the military directorate of the canton of Zurich it is forbidden until further notice to play on the military training area Allmend". In the age of mobile communications, a short-term postponement may not attract much attention. But at the end of the 19th century constant accessibility wasn't even wishful thinking. The following could be read about the game against FC Basel which was brought forward from the afternoon to the morning: “As a result, the Anglos, who were only partially able to notify their people, started the game with only seven men. Only during the course of the game was the team completed to the full eleven. There were also replacements in Basel's team, because some players did not arrive until a later train. The appointed referee was not there because he been scheduled for the afternoon. The crowd consisted of approximately 10 to 20 spectators. Under such circumstances, such an important match should not have been played." Despite all the obstacles: The game became a demonstration of the superiority of the British players from Zurich. The Anglo American Football Club won the match 10–0, with their center forward Robert Collinson alone scoring 8 goals. By then, at the latest, it was clear that the Anglos would be unstoppable on their way to the title.

Between the years 1893 and 1902, Schiess played a total of 72 games for Basel scoring a total of 14 goals. (Note: Scorers: many pre-First World War game sheets no longer exist or are incomplete and so, many line ups and most goal scorers in this period remain unknown.) 17 of these games were in the Swiss Serie A (Note: League: up until 1898 there was no league football in Switzerland.) and 55 were friendly games.

He was also a member of the FC Basel board of directors. He presided over the club's board during 1896 and during the 1901–02 season.

== Notes ==
=== Sources ===
- Rotblau: Jahrbuch Saison 2017/2018. Publisher: FC Basel Marketing AG. ISBN 978-3-7245-2189-1
- Die ersten 125 Jahre. Publisher: Josef Zindel im Friedrich Reinhardt Verlag, Basel. ISBN 978-3-7245-2305-5
- Verein "Basler Fussballarchiv" Homepage
