= Hermann Schneider (footballer) =

Swiss footballer (born 1877)

Personal information
- Full name: Hermann Schneider
- Date of birth: 4 January 1877
- Place of birth: Switzerland
- Position: Striker

Senior career*
| Years | Team | Apps | (Gls) |
| 1896–1901 (Note: League: up until 1898 there was no league football in Switzerland.) | FC Basel | 7 | (1) |
- * Club domestic league appearances and goals

Hermann Schneider (4 January 1877; date of death unknown) was a Swiss footballer who played for FC Basel. He played as forward.

== Football career ==
Schneider joined the Basel first team during their 1896–97 season, two years before the Swiss Serie A was founded. In his first season he played seven test games. In his second season he played 10 times and was the team's top scorer with six goals.

The first official Swiss championship season 1898–99 was played as a knock out competition, divided into three regional groups, an east (region Zürich), a central (regional north-west Switzerland) and west group (Romandy). The winners of each group played the finals in a round-robin tournament. Basel played in the central group semi-final against Old Boys. Because the game was drawn, one goal each, it required a replay. This replay was held in the Stadion Schützenmatte on 18 December 1898. This was also drawn 2–2, despite an agreed 2x 20 minutes extra time. Schneider played in both games. Because the Old Boys complained that the first FCB goal scored by Rudolf La Roche in the 10th minute had been scored by hand, they protested and the ASF-SFV had to deal with the matter. Subsequently, the protest was approved and the game awarded - and the disputed goal was simply deducted from the score to give the final result. Thus the Old Boys became the first forfait winners in Swiss football history and Basel were knocked out of the competition. The Old Boys advanced to the finals, but the Anglo-American Club Zürich became Swiss champions.

A curiosity in this 1898–99 season was the game in Zürich on 5 March 1899. The majority of them English students, had formed a club and the members of the Anglo-American Club even attended the founder meeting of the Swiss Football Association (ASF-SFV) in April 1895. They had found a place to play their games, although the Zurich commons was by no means ideal. It was often that the players found the grounds very sludgy or with freshly raised molehills. But at least, it was a homestead that was soon called "Anglo-Platz". Suddenly the announcement: "By decree of the military directorate of the canton of Zurich it is forbidden until further notice to play on the military training area Allmend". In the age of mobile communications, a short-term postponement may not attract much attention. But at the end of the 19th century constant accessibility wasn't even wishful thinking. The following could be read about the game against FC Basel which was brought forward from the afternoon to the morning: "As a result, the Anglos, who were only partially able to notify their people, started the game with only seven men. Only during the course of the game was the team completed to the full eleven. There were also replacements in Basel's team, because some players did not arrive until a later train. The appointed referee was not there because he been scheduled for the afternoon. The crowd consisted of approximately 10 to 20 spectators. Under such circumstances, such an important match should not have been played." Despite all the obstacles: The game became a demonstration of the superiority of the British players from Zurich. The Anglo American Football Club won the match 10–0, with their center forward Robert Collinson alone scoring 8 goals. By then, at the latest, it was clear that the Anglos would be unstoppable on their way to the title.

Basel did not compete in the championship the following season, Schneider played in 12 of the team's 16 test games. The Serie A 1900–01 season was played as a two group league competition. The West group had four teams, the East group contained six teams including Basel. Schneider played in five of the team's ten domestic league games and scored his only league goal in the hone match against Fire Flies Zürich which was drawn 1–1 on 28 October 1900. After that season Schneider ended his active football.

Between the years 1896 and 1901 Schneider played a total of 44 games for Basel scoring a total of 10 goals. (Note: Scorers: many pre-First World War game sheets no longer exist or are incomplete and so, many line ups and most goal scorers in this period remain unknown.) Seven of these games were in the Swiss Serie A and 37 were friendly games. He scored one goal in the domestic league and the other nine were scored during the test games.

== Notes ==
=== Sources ===
- Rotblau: Jahrbuch Saison 2017/2018. Publisher: FC Basel Marketing AG. ISBN 978-3-7245-2189-1
- Die ersten 125 Jahre. Publisher: Josef Zindel im Friedrich Reinhardt Verlag, Basel. ISBN 978-3-7245-2305-5
- Verein "Basler Fussballarchiv" Homepage
