= Charles Volderauer =

Swiss businessman (1871–1931)

Personal information
- Full name: Charles (Charlie) Volderauer
- Date of birth: 30 May 1871
- Place of birth: Switzerland
- Date of death: 6 October 1931 (aged 60)
- Place of death: Basel, Switzerland
- Position: Defender

Senior career*
| Years | Team | Apps | (Gls) |
| 1893–1899 | FC Basel | 0 | (0) |
- * Club domestic league appearances and goals

Charles (Charlie) Volderauer (30 May 1871 – 6 October 1931) was a Swiss businessman. He was founder member of the club FC Basel, played various matches for them as defender, was voted into the board of directors and was the club's president for more than three years.

== Football career ==
Volderauer was one of the founders members of FC Basel on 15 November 1893. Between the years 1893 and 1899 he played at least 33 test matches as defender without scoring a goal. Most of these games were before the Swiss Serie A was founded.

The first edition of the official Swiss championship season 1898–99 was played as a knock out competition, divided into three regional groups, an east (region Zürich), a central (regional north-west Switzerland) and west group (Romandy). The winners of each group played the finals in a round-robin tournament. Basel played in the central group semi-final against Old Boys in a home game at the Landhof on 13 November 1898. Because the game was drawn, one goal each, it required a replay. This replay was held in the Stadion Schützenmatte on 18 December 1898. This was also drawn 2–2, despite an agreed 2x 20 minutes extra time. Because the Old Boys complained that the first FCB goal scored by Rudolf La Roche in the 10th minute had been scored by hand, they protested and the ASF-SFV had to deal with the matter. Subsequently, the protest was approved and the game awarded - and the disputed goal was simply deducted from the score to give the final result. Thus the Old Boys became the first forfait winners in Swiss football history and Basel were knocked out of the competition. The Old Boys advanced to the finals, but the Anglo-American Club Zürich became Swiss champions.

A curiosity in this 1898–99 season was the game in Zürich on 5 March 1899. The majority of them English students, had formed a club and the members of the Anglo-American Club even attended the founder meeting of the Swiss Football Association (ASF-SFV) in April 1895. They had found a place to play their games, although the Zurich commons was by no means ideal. It was often that the players found the grounds very sludgy or with freshly raised molehills. But at least, it was a homestead that was soon called "Anglo-Platz". Suddenly the announcement: "By decree of the military directorate of the canton of Zurich it is forbidden until further notice to play on the military training area Allmend". In the age of mobile communications, a short-term postponement may not attract much attention. But at the end of the 19th century constant accessibility wasn't even wishful thinking. The following could be read about the game against FC Basel which was brought forward from the afternoon to the morning: “As a result, the Anglos, who were only partially able to notify their people, started the game with only seven men. Only during the course of the game was the team completed to the full eleven. There were also replacements in Basel's team, because some players did not arrive until a later train. The appointed referee was not there because he been scheduled for the afternoon. The crowd consisted of approximately 10 to 20 spectators. Under such circumstances, such an important match should not have been played." Despite all the obstacles: The game became a demonstration of the superiority of the British players from Zurich. The Anglo American Football Club won the match 10–0, with their center forward Robert Collinson alone scoring 8 goals. By then, at the latest, it was clear that the Anglos would be unstoppable on their way to the title.

For many years Volderauer was member of the FC Basel board of directors and presided over the club's board during the time from December 1896 until 18 January 1900. As businessman he had good connections and he used them from the very beginning. As early as June 1894, he organised the journey to visit Strassburger FV, and he played in the match, which ended in a 0–8 defeat. He also arranged various other matches with international teams from France and England.

In the documentation of the club's 50th anniversary it is written: He was an excellent defender. He held the office of President for years. Arranged the first games in Switzerland against British professional clubs: Newcastle United and Celtic Glasgow. He was an enthusiastic and very active club member. The afore mentioned games with Newcastle United and Celtic were held in the spring of 1911. The match against Newcastle was held at Basel's home ground the Landhof on 21 May. The visitors won by seven goals to one. The match against Celtic was held one week later on 27 May. Here too the visitors won the match. Celtic won by five goals to one.

== Sources ==
- Rotblau: Jahrbuch Saison 2017/2018. Publisher: FC Basel Marketing AG. ISBN 978-3-7245-2189-1
- Die ersten 125 Jahre. Publisher: Josef Zindel im Friedrich Reinhardt Verlag, Basel. ISBN 978-3-7245-2305-5
- Verein "Basler Fussballarchiv" Homepage
