= Emil Westermann =

Swiss sports leader

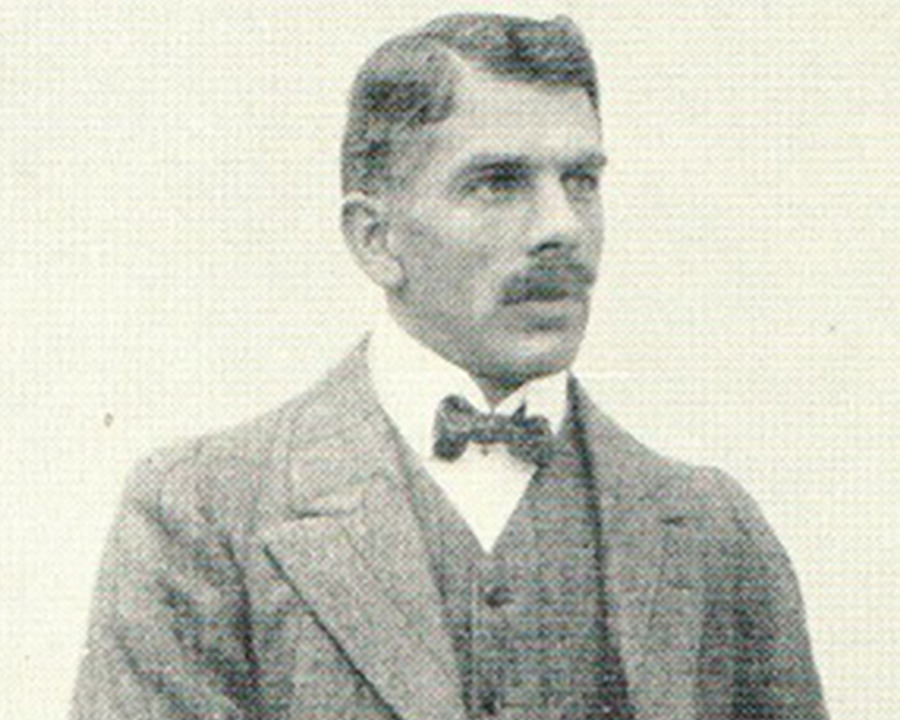
- Emil Westermann

1st President of the Swiss Football Association
- In office 7 April 1895 – 1898
- Succeeded by: Max Auckenthaler

Personal details
- Born: Emil J. Westermann; Switzerland

Emil J. Westermann was a Swiss sports leader who served as the first president of the Swiss Football Association from 7 April 1895 until 1898. He also refereed the first-ever unofficial international match of a Swiss selection in 1898.

== Sporting career ==
Very little is known about his life; Westermann was the captain of the Grasshopper Club Zurich when, in February 1895, he wrote a letter to all the existing football clubs in Switzerland in which he invited the clubs who were interested in founding an association to the conveniently located Olten train station buffet, where on 7 April 1895, eleven clubs gathered to found the Swiss Football Association (ASF), and naturally, Westermann was named as its first-ever president. In the first few months, the work of the ASF went smoothly, sending the translated rules of the English FA to all Swiss clubs, whether or not they were affiliated to the ASF, in order to ensure that all of their friendlies and competitions were held according to fairly uniform rules.

In 1897, Westermann refused to set up a competition, stating that "due to their financial and structural situation, it is absolutely impossible for most clubs to undertake such long journeys", so it was a Geneva sports weekly newspaper, La Suisse Sportive, which stepped forward to set up one in 1897–98, which was won by Grasshopper, but since it was not organized by the SFA, it is therefore considered as unofficial. It was also under his presidency, in 1897, that Zurich hosted its first international match, on the pitch at the Velodrome Hardau, in which FC Zürich defeated FC Fidelitas Karlsruhe 3–0. On 4 December 1898, Westermann refereed the first-ever unofficial international match of a Swiss selection, which ended in a 3–1 victory over South Germany at the Landhof in Basel.
