= Edmond Racle =

Swiss footballer (born 1880)

Personal information
- Full name: Edmond Racle
- Date of birth: 30 September 1880
- Place of birth: Switzerland
- Positions: Midfielder; striker

Senior career*
Years	Team	Apps	(Gls)
1898–1901	FC Basel	(Note: Swiss League: up until 1900 Basel only contested two Swiss league games.)	
- * Club domestic league appearances and goals

Edmond Racle (born 30 September 1880) was a Swiss footballer who played as striker and as midfielder during the late 1890s and the early 1900s.

== Football career ==
FC Basel was founded on 15 November 1893 and Racle joined the club about five years later, during their 1898–99 season. During his first season with the club Racle did not play in any first team games. Racle played his first game for the club in the first game of the following season. This was a home game at the Landhof on 8 October 1899, but Basel were defeated 0–4 by FC Fortuna Zürich. During the 1899–1900 season Racle played only three of the teams 16 friendly games. Basel did not compete in the Swiss championship this season.

In their 1900–01 season Basel contested the 1900–01 Swiss Serie A, being assigned to the East group. Racle made his domestic league debut for the club in the away game on 10 March 1901 against FC Fortuna Basel. FCB protested because of the unplayable pitch, the protest was granted, Fortuna subsequently waivered a replay and the match was awarded forfait.

Racle played a total of five games for Basel without scoring a goal. (Note: Scorers: many pre-First World War game sheets no longer exist or are incomplete and so, many line ups and most goal scorers in this period remain unknown.) One of these games were in the Swiss Serie A and the other four were friendly games.

== Notes ==
=== Sources ===
- Rotblau: Jahrbuch Saison 2017/2018. Publisher: FC Basel Marketing AG. ISBN 978-3-7245-2189-1
- Die ersten 125 Jahre. Publisher: Josef Zindel im Friedrich Reinhardt Verlag, Basel. ISBN 978-3-7245-2305-5
- Verein "Basler Fussballarchiv" Homepage

(NB: Despite all efforts, the editors of these books and the authors in "Basler Fussballarchiv" have failed to be able to identify all the players, their date and place of birth or date and place of death, who played in the games during the early years of FC Basel)
