= Max Zutt =

Swiss footballer (born 1880)

Personal information
- Full name: Max Zutt
- Date of birth: 17 August 1880
- Place of birth: Switzerland
- Positions: Midfielder; forward

Senior career*
Years	Team	Apps	(Gls)
1899–1900	FC Basel	(Note: League: Basel did not play league football this season.)	
- * Club domestic league appearances and goals

Max Zutt (born 17 August 1880) was a Swiss footballer who played as forward, or as midfielder in the late 1890s and early 1900s.

== Football career ==
FC Basel was founded on 15 November 1893 and Zutt joined FC Basel's first team six years later for their 1899–1900 season. Zutt played his first game for the club in the home game in the Landhof on 8 October 1899 as Basel were defeated 0–4 by FC Fortuna Zürich.

Zutt played 10 of the 16 team's friendly games that season, without scoring a goal. (Note: Scorers: many pre-First World War game sheets no longer exist or are incomplete and so, many line ups and most goal scorers in this period remain unknown.) Basel did not play league football this season.

== Notes ==
=== Sources ===
- Rotblau: Jahrbuch Saison 2017/2018. Publisher: FC Basel Marketing AG. ISBN 978-3-7245-2189-1
- Die ersten 125 Jahre. Publisher: Josef Zindel im Friedrich Reinhardt Verlag, Basel. ISBN 978-3-7245-2305-5
- Verein "Basler Fussballarchiv" Homepage

(NB: Despite all efforts, the editors of these books and the authors in "Basler Fussballarchiv" have failed to be able to identify all the players, their date and place of birth or date and place of death, who played in the games during the early years of FC Basel)
