= Eric Mory =

Swiss footballer (born 1879)

Personal information
- Full name: Eric Mory
- Date of birth: 17 April 1879
- Place of birth: Switzerland
- Positions: Midfielder; striker

Senior career*
Years	Team	Apps	(Gls)
1896–1898	FC Basel	(Note: League: up until 1898 there was no league football in Switzerland.)	
1904–1905	BSC Old Boys		

International career
1905	Switzerland	1	(0)
- * Club domestic league appearances and goals

Eric Mory (born 17 April 1879) was a Swiss footballer who played as striker or midfielder during the 1890s and early 1900s.

== Football career ==
FC Basel was founded on 15 November 1893 and Mory joined the club about three years later, during their 1896–97 season. Mory played his first game for the club in the away game on 8 November 1896 as Basel were defeated 1–2 by Grasshopper Club.

Mory stayed with the club for two seasons. During the first season he played in six of the team's seven matches and in the second he played in nine out of ten matches. (Note: Scorers: many pre-First World War game sheets no longer exist or are incomplete and so, many line ups and most goal scorers in this period remain unknown.) The last game that Mory played for Basel was on 8 May 1898 as Basel won 2–0 against FC Fortuna Zürich. His teammate John Tollmann acted as referee in that match.

Following his time in Basel, Mory moved across the city and joined local rivals BSC Old Boys.

The Swiss Football Association (ASF-SFV) was formed in 1895 and was a founder member of FIFA in 1904. The following year the Switzerland national team played their first official international match against France on 12 February 1905. Mory played his only international for the Swiss team in this match, which was played at the Parc des Princes in front of 500 supporters. France won the match 1–0 with the only goal coming from Gaston Cyprès.

== Notes ==
=== Sources ===
- Rotblau: Jahrbuch Saison 2017/2018. Publisher: FC Basel Marketing AG. ISBN 978-3-7245-2189-1
- Die ersten 125 Jahre. Publisher: Josef Zindel im Friedrich Reinhardt Verlag, Basel. ISBN 978-3-7245-2305-5
- Verein "Basler Fussballarchiv" Homepage

(NB: Despite all efforts, the editors of these books and the authors in "Basler Fussballarchiv" have failed to be able to identify all the players, their date and place of birth or date and place of death, who played in the games during the early years of FC Basel.)
