= Walter Zürrer =

Walter Zürrer may refer to:

- Walter Zürrer (footballer, born 1916), Swiss footballer for FC Basel
- Walter Zürrer (footballer, born 1879), Swiss footballer for FC Basel
