= Hans Krostina =

German footballer (1948–2019)

Personal information
- Date of birth: 14 August 1948
- Date of death: 4 February 2019 (aged 70)
- Position: Midfielder

Senior career*
| Years | Team | Apps | (Gls) |
| 1967–1968 | Fortuna Düsseldorf | | |
| 1968–1971 | Fortuna Köln | | |
| 1971–1972 | Arminia Hannover | | |
| 1972–1975 | Turnhout | | |
| 1975–1976 | A.S.V. Oostende K.M. | | |
| 1976–1977 | Rot-Weiss Essen | 15 | (0) |
| 1977–1978 | FC Bayern Hof | 24 | (4) |
| 1978–1980 | MTV Ingolstadt | 69 | (24) |

Managerial career
- 1983–1985: FC Vaduz
- 1985–1988: FC Chur
- 1989: BSC Old Boys
- 1991–1992: SpVgg Bayreuth
- 1994: Türkspor Berlin
- * Club domestic league appearances and goals

Hans Krostina (14 August 1948 – 4 February 2019) was a German football player and manager who played as a midfielder.
