= Walter Zürrer (footballer, born 1879) =

Swiss footballer

Personal information
- Full name: Walter Zürrer
- Date of birth: 8 June 1879
- Place of birth: Switzerland
- Date of death: 1955
- Positions: Midfielder; striker

Senior career*
Years	Team	Apps	(Gls)
1897–1898	FC Basel	(Note: League: up until 1898 there was no league football in Switzerland.)	
- * Club domestic league appearances and goals

Walter Zürrer (born 8 June 1879) was a Swiss footballer who played as striker and midfielder for FC Basel in the 1890s.

== Football career ==
FC Basel was founded on 15 November 1893 and Zürrer joined the club about three years later, during their 1897–98 season. Zürrer played his first game for the club in the home game on 24 October 1897 as Basel won 7–0 against Biel-Bienne. The goal scorers in this match are not known.

He played with the club this one season and during this time Zürrer played three games for Basel without scoring a goal.

Zürrer played his last game with the team in the home game in the St. Jakob Stadium on 14 November as Basel won 3–1 against FC Excelsior Zürich. (Note: Scorers: many pre-First World War game sheets no longer exist or are incomplete and so, many line ups and most goal scorers in this period remain unknown.)

== Notes ==
=== Sources ===
- Rotblau: Jahrbuch Saison 2017/2018. Publisher: FC Basel Marketing AG. ISBN 978-3-7245-2189-1
- Die ersten 125 Jahre. Publisher: Josef Zindel im Friedrich Reinhardt Verlag, Basel. ISBN 978-3-7245-2305-5
- Verein "Basler Fussballarchiv" Homepage

(NB: Despite all efforts, the editors of these books and the authors in "Basler Fussballarchiv" have failed to be able to identify all the players, their date and place of birth or date and place of death, who played in the games during the early years of FC Basel)
