= Albert Linder (footballer) =

Swiss footballer (born 1877)

Personal information
- Full name: Albert Linder
- Date of birth: 8 November 1877
- Place of birth: Switzerland
- Date of death: unknown
- Positions: Midfielder; striker

Senior career*
Years	Team	Apps	(Gls)
1895–1898	FC Basel	(Note: League: up until 1898 there was no league football in Switzerland.)	
- * Club domestic league appearances and goals

Albert Linder (born 8 November 1877) was a Swiss footballer who played for FC Basel during the 1890s. He played mainly in the position as striker, but also as midfielder.

== Football career ==
FC Basel was founded on 15 November 1893 and Linder joined the club about two years later, during their 1895–96 season. Linder played his first game for the club in the home game on 23 November 1895 as Basel played their first ever game against Anglo-American Club Zürich.

Linder stayed with the team for three seasons and during this time he played 13 games for Basel without scoring a goal. (Note: Scorers: many pre-First World War game sheets no longer exist or are incomplete and so, many line ups and most goal scorers in this period remain unknown.)

== Notes ==
=== Sources ===
- Rotblau: Jahrbuch Saison 2017/2018. Publisher: FC Basel Marketing AG. ISBN 978-3-7245-2189-1
- Die ersten 125 Jahre. Publisher: Josef Zindel im Friedrich Reinhardt Verlag, Basel. ISBN 978-3-7245-2305-5
- Verein "Basler Fussballarchiv" Homepage

(NB: Despite all efforts, the editors of these books and the authors in "Basler Fussballarchiv" have failed to be able to identify all the players, their date and place of birth or date and place of death, who played in the games during the early years of FC Basel)
