= Rudolf Bax =

English-Swiss footballer (born 1878)

Personal information
- Date of birth: 24 November 1878
- Positions: Midfielder; striker

Senior career*
Years	Team	Apps	(Gls)
1895–1896	Buckjumpers Club Basel		
1896–1897	FC Basel (Note: Up until 1898 there was no league football in Switzerland)		
- * Club domestic league appearances and goals

Rudolf Bax (born 24 November 1878) was an English-Swiss footballer who played as striker or midfielder during the 1890s.

== Career ==
Bax first played football with the Buckjumpers Club Basel, a team made up from high school students and upper secondary school pupils, founded in 1894. As the club disbanded in 1896, some of their members joined FC Basel during their 1895–96 season and Bax was one of them.

Bax played his game for his new club in the home game on 8 November 1896 as Basel were defeated 1–2 by Grasshopper Club.

Bax stayed with the Basel team for the entire season and played in six of the club's seven games during that period. Because the game sheets for this season no longer exist or are incomplete, although all the player line ups are clear, all goal scorers in this season remain unknown.
