= Lausanne Football and Cricket Club =

- Full name: Lausanne Football and Cricket Club
Home colours	Away colours

The Lausanne Football and Cricket Club was a Swiss association football and cricket club.

The club was founded in 1860 by English students, who had studied at private schools in the area of Lausanne. During the year of the foundation this club could be the first soccer club in Continental Europe. The worldwide first soccer club Sheffield F.C. is only three years older, however it is likely that Lausanne played cricket before football at the club (as it was more well established).

It is unknown in which "football form" the Lausanne Football and Cricket Club have played, because at that time the "association football" rules still did not exist. The club was also a founder member of the Swiss Football Association and participated at the first Swiss championship 1897/98 as well as the second championship 1898/99.

== See also ==
- 1860s in association football

== Links ==
- Die Geschichte des Fussballs (in German)
