= Louis Gürtler =

Swiss footballer

Personal information
- Full name: Louis Gürtler
- Date of birth: 22 May 1879
- Place of birth: Switzerland
- Position: Midfielder

Senior career*
Years	Team	Apps	(Gls)
1896–1899	FC Basel	(Note: League: up until 1898 there was no league football in Switzerland.)	
- * Club domestic league appearances and goals

Louis Gürtler (born 22 May 1877) was a Swiss footballer who played in the 1890s as midfielder.

== Football career ==
FC Basel was founded on 15 November 1893 and Gürtler joined the club about three years later, during their 1896–97 season. Gürtler played his first game for the club in the away game on 22 November 1896 as Basel were hosted by French team FC Mulhouse. Mulhouse got the better end and won 3–2.

Gürtler stayed with the club for three seasons and during this time he played 13 games for Basel without scoring a goal. (Note: Scorers: many pre-First World War game sheets no longer exist or are incomplete and so, many line ups and most goal scorers in this period remain unknown.)

The last game that he played for Basel was on 23 October 1898 as Basel won 5–1 against FC Bern. That morning, Bern had also played a game against the FCB second team, which they won 6–2, this was match in the "Coupe Ruinart" (Serie B championship), the second tier of the Swiss championships.

== Notes ==
=== Sources ===
- Rotblau: Jahrbuch Saison 2017/2018. Publisher: FC Basel Marketing AG. ISBN 978-3-7245-2189-1
- Die ersten 125 Jahre. Publisher: Josef Zindel im Friedrich Reinhardt Verlag, Basel. ISBN 978-3-7245-2305-5
- Verein "Basler Fussballarchiv" Homepage

(NB: Despite all efforts, the editors of these books and the authors in "Basler Fussballarchiv" have failed to be able to identify all the players, their date and place of birth or date and place of death, who played in the games during the early years of FC Basel)
