= 1897–98 Swiss Serie A =

Swiss football season

Swiss Serie A
- Season: 1897–98

The first Swiss football championship was held 1897–98. The championship was not organized by the Swiss Football Association (SFA; founded in 1895) and is therefore considered as unofficial. The tournament was organized by the Geneva newspaper La Suisse Sportive and its editors François-Jean Dégérine and Dr. Aimé Schwob. The championship trophy was donated by the company Ruinart. Only four of the clubs competing were members of the SFA; FC Château de Lancy, Grasshopper Club Zürich, Neuchâtel FC and La Villa Ouchy). The series A was divided into three regional groups, group A in the north, group B the district around Lausanne and group C district of Genève). The winner of each group qualified for the finals.

The following are the statistics to the first Swiss national football (soccer) competition (later Swiss Super League).

== Group A ==
Club	Score	Club
Grasshopper Club Zürich	7-2	FC Zürich

== Group B ==
Club	Score	Club
Villa Longchamp Lausanne	1-0	FC Yverdon
Lausanne Football and Cricket Club	4-0	Maison Neuve Vevey
Lausanne Football and Cricket Club	5-2	Villa d'Ouchy (Lausanne)
Villa Longchamp Lausanne	1-0	Lausanne Football and Cricket Club

== Group C ==
Club	Score	Club
Le Château de Lancy	4-0	Racing Club de Geneve
La Châtelaine Genève	9-2	Le Château de Lancy

== Final ==
Club	Score	Club
Grasshopper Club Zürich	6-1	Villa Longchamp Lausanne
Grasshopper Club Zürich	2-0	La Châtelaine Genève

Grasshopper Club Zürich won the championship.

== Sources ==
- Switzerland 1898-99 at RSSSF
