= 1899–1900 Swiss Serie A =

Swiss football season

Swiss Serie A
- Season: 1899–1900

Photograph of the Grasshopper Club Zürich championship team from 1900, taken at the studio of Johannes Meiner, Zurich

Statistics of Swiss Super League in the 1899–1900 season.

== East ==
Pos	Team	Pld	W	D	L	GF	GA	GD	Pts
1	Grasshopper Club Zürich	8	8	0	0	32	9	+23	16
2	FC Zürich	8	4	1	3	16	10	+6	9
3	Anglo-American Club Zürich	8	3	0	5	9	21	−12	6
4	BSC Old Boys Basel	8	2	1	5	12	19	−7	5
5	Vereinigte FC St. Gallen	8	2	0	6	9	19	−10	4

Source: rsssf.com

== West ==
Pos	Team	Pld	W	D	L	GF	GA	GD	Pts
1	FC Bern	2	2	0	0	5	2	+3	4
2	FC Neuchâtel	2	0	0	2	2	5	−3	0

Source: rsssf.com

== Final ==
Team 1	Score	Team 2
18 March 1900
Grasshopper	2–0	Bern

Grasshopper Club Zürich won the championship.

== Sources ==
- Switzerland 1899-1900 at RSSSF
