= Robert Collinson =

English cricketer and rugby union footballer

Robert Whiteley Collinson (6 November 1875 – 26 December 1963 (aged 88)) was an English first-class cricketer, who played two matches for Yorkshire County Cricket Club in 1897 as an amateur.

Born in Moss Side, Halifax, West Riding of Yorkshire, England, Collinson was a right-handed batsman, who scored 58 runs in total, with a best of 34 against Gloucestershire, for an average of 19.33. His other match was against Somerset in 1897, which was his first-class cricket debut. Collinson also appeared in two non first-class matches for Yorkshire against Durham in 1896, scoring 82 at Feethams, Darlington. He also played for Norfolk in the Minor Counties Cricket Championship from 1910 to 1913.

He played his early cricket with Halifax C.C. and Collinson also played rugby union for Yorkshire.

In the late 1890s Collinson studied in Zürich, at the chemical engineering department at the Federal Polytechnic School. During this time he played football and joined the Anglo-American Club Zürich. A curiosity in this season was the game in Zürich on 5 March 1899 against FC Basel. They had found a place to play their games, although the Zurich commons was by no means ideal. It was often that the players found the grounds very sludgy or with freshly raised molehills. But at least, it was a homestead that was soon called "Anglo-Platz". Suddenly the announcement: "By decree of the military directorate of the canton of Zurich it is forbidden until further notice to play on the military training area Allmend". In the age of mobile communications, a short-term postponement may not attract much attention. But at the end of the 19th century constant accessibility wasn't even wishful thinking. The following could be read about the game against FC Basel which was brought forward from the afternoon to the morning: “As a result, the Anglos, who were only partially able to notify their people, started the game with only seven men. Only during the course of the game was the team completed to the full eleven. There were also replacements in Basel's team, because some players did not arrive until a later train. The appointed referee was not there because he been scheduled for the afternoon. The crowd consisted of approximately 10 to 20 spectators. Under such circumstances, such an important match should not have been played." Despite all the obstacles: The game became a demonstration of the superiority of the British players from Zurich. The Anglo American Football Club won the match 10–0, with their center forward Robert Collinson alone scoring 8 goals. By then, at the latest, it was clear that the Anglos would be unstoppable on their way to the title.

The Anglos played in the 1898–99 Swiss Serie A season. In group East they were matched against Grasshopper Club Zürich. The game was drawn and thus a replay was required, which was won by the Anglos. In the next round they played against FC Zürich and won 5–0. They therefore qualified for the finals. In the final play-off group the majority of the English players from Lausanne Football and Cricket Club refused to play the match against BSC Old Boys because it was scheduled for a Sunday thus forfeiting victory for the Old Boys. This was the first forfeit in Swiss football history. The Anglos won the match against Old Boys 7–0 and thus the Swiss championship.

Collinson died aged 88, in December 1963 in Thorpe St Andrew, Norwich.
