= Swiss Super League =

Swiss men's association football top division

- Founded: 1898; 128 years ago as Serie A 1933; 93 years ago as Nationalliga A
- Country: Switzerland
- Confederation: UEFA
- Number of clubs: 12
- Level on pyramid: 1
- Relegation to: Challenge League
- Domestic cup: Swiss Cup
- International cup: UEFA Champions League UEFA Europa League UEFA Conference League
- Current champions: Thun (1st title) (2025–26)
- Most championships: Grasshopper (27 titles)
- Broadcasters: Switzerland blue Sport SRG SSR; Outside Switzerland SFL TV
- Website: sfl.ch
- Current: 2026–27 Swiss Super League

The Super League (also known as the Brack Super League for sponsorship reasons) is a professional association football league in Switzerland and the highest level of the Swiss football league system. It has been played in its current format since the 2003–04 season. The Swiss Super League is ranked 16th in Europe according to UEFA's ranking of league coefficients, which is based upon Swiss team performances in European competitions. The 2026–27 season is the 130th season of the Swiss top-flight, making it the longest continuously running top-flight national league.

== Overview ==
The Super League is played over 33 rounds from July to May. Teams plays each other three times, one and a half at home and one and a half away, in a round-robin format. After 33 rounds, the league splits into Championship and Relegation rounds, with 5 matches respectively.

As teams from both Switzerland and Liechtenstein participate in the Swiss football leagues, only a Swiss club finishing in first place will be crowned champion—should a team from Liechtenstein win, this honor will go to the highest-placed Swiss team. Relative to their league coefficient ranking the highest-placed teams will compete in UEFA competitions—again with exception of teams from Liechtenstein, who qualify through the Liechtenstein Cup. The bottom team will be relegated to the Challenge League and replaced by the respective champion for the next season. The club finishing in 11th place will compete against the second-placed team of the Challenge League in a relegation play-off over two games, home and away, for a spot in the succeeding tournament.

Matches in the Super League employ the use of a video assistant referee.

== History ==
Previous names
Years	German	French	Italian
1897	Coupe Ruinart (unofficial)		
1898–1929	Serie A		
1930–1931	1. Liga	1e Ligue	Prima Lega
1931–1933	Nationalliga	Ligue Nationale	Lega Nazionale
1933–1934	Challenge National		
1934–1944	Nationalliga	Ligue Nationale	Lega Nazionale
1944–2003	Nationalliga A	Ligue Nationale A	Lega Nazionale A
2003–present	Super League axpo Super League (2003–2012); Raiffeisen Super League (2012–2021); Credit Suisse Super League (2021–2025); Brack Super League (2025–present)		

=== Serie A era ===
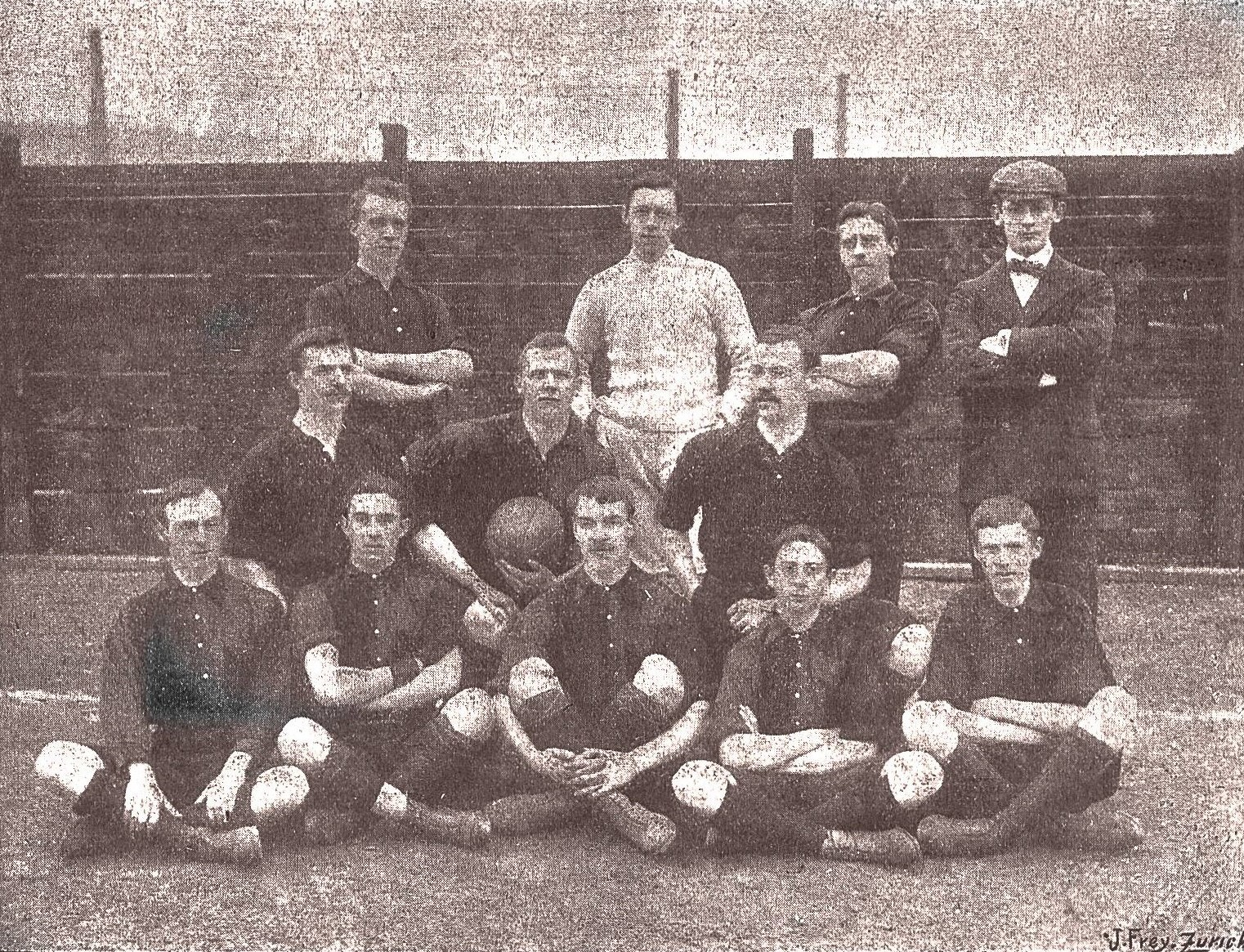
Anglo-American Club, winners of the first championship organized by the Swiss Football Association.

The Swiss Football Association was founded in 1895, but were initially unable to organize an annual competition, citing the teams' travel costs. The first unofficial championship, competed for the Ruinart Cup, was organized by Genevan newspaper La Suisse sportive as a response in 1897. It was mainly contested by teams from the French-speaking area, with the exception of FC Zürich and Grasshopper Club Zürich, the latter of which eventually won the tournament. The inaugural official championship was therefore organized for the following season, in 1898–99, and won by Anglo-American Club against Old Boys Basel. It was, however, only competed by Swiss-German teams (with the exception of a team from Neuchâtel) until 1900, due to a dispute about playing on Sundays.

Teams from the canton of Zürich continued to dominate the league until 1907–08, with Grasshoppers winning a further three, FC Winterthur winning two, and FC Zürich winning one title. Other champions from that time included Servette, St. Gallen, and Young Boys, who subsequently also won three in a row from 1908–1911. Over the next decade, FC Aarau, Montriond LS (now Lausanne-Sport), SC Brühl, and Cantonal Neuchâtel FC each won their first title as nobody managed to monopolize the league. During the 1920s and 1930s, championships were achieved almost exclusively by modern Super League regulars, namely Grasshoppers, Servette, Zürich, Young Boys, Lausanne-Sport, and FC Lugano. FC Bern was the exception in 1923; however, their championship was denied after the use of an unauthorized player.

=== Nationalliga era ===
The league was reformed into the Nationalliga in 1931 and initially changed from three regional groups to two groups with 9 teams each. The league composition thereafter varied on several occasions, ranging from 12 to 16 teams competing in a single group. Contrary to its neighboring countries, national football was not suspended during World War II due to Switzerland's neutrality, but the post-war years nevertheless brought change. The 1944–45 season saw the separation of the league into the Nationalliga A and B, with the winner of the former declared Swiss champion. The 1946–47, 1947–48, 1952–53, and 1953–54 seasons saw further maiden victories achieved by FC Biel-Bienne, AC Bellinzona, FC Basel, and FC La-Chaux-de-Fonds, respectively. In 1954, broadcasting rights were sold to SRG SSR for the first time, with the company initially being restricted in showing games on TV. For the 1956–57 season, jersey numbers were declared mandatory, with Young Boys initiating an unprecedented streak of four titles the same season.

The 1966–67 season first saw the emergence of Basel as a dominant team, as they won 7 of the following 14 seasons. As shirt sponsors first appeared by 1976, the SRG SSR refused to broadcast teams that wore advertisements on their kits. As a result, the broadcaster and the league reached a compromise, where the former would only show sponsors in reports lasting a maximum of 6 minutes, and teams would be obligated to wear neutral jerseys for longer appearances. The 1980s and 1990s saw Grasshoppers dominate and Neuchâtel Xamax, FC Luzern, and FC Sion win their first titles in 1986–87, 1988–89, and 1991–92. In 1985, the number of foreigners on a team was increased from one to two, promptly leading to a new transfer record of 1.3 million francs with Servette acquiring Mats Magnusson. In 1992–93 Aarau won the championship the first time in 79 years, while St. Gallen earned their first title in 97 years at the turn of the millennium.

=== Super League era ===
The rebranding of the Nationalliga A into the Super League occurred in 2003, when the league was restructured from 12 to 10 teams for the 2003–04 season, simplifying the format by removing the relegation playoff round. A return to 12 teams was discussed on multiple occasions in 2009 and 2018, but ultimately rejected, among others due to reservations about the early relegation battle.

This new era initially proved to be one of domination for Basel, as 11 of the first 14 seasons were won by them, including a record-breaking streak of 8 championships between 2009 and 2017. After a change in leadership in 2017, however, they were dethroned by Young Boys, who won the next four straight championships.

==== 2022 format change ====
In April 2022, another proposal by the SFL committee to increase the league size to 12 was announced. The proposal includes three stages: an initial round-robin qualifying stage with all 12 teams (22 rounds); an intermediary stage, with two groups (1st-6th placed in the Championship and 7-12th placed in the Qualification Group) of six teams each (10 rounds); the format of the third and final playoff phase is still to be determined. Despite pushback from fans and a general negative response from club officials, the proposal to increase the league size as well as the proposed format change were approved by the general assembly of the Swiss Football League on 20 May 2022.

The details of the final playoff stage was also finalized:

- The first and second placed teams of the Championship Group will play a best of three Championship Final. The first placed team has home advantage in the first and third game.
- The 3rd-6th placed teams of the Championship Group and the 1st-4th placed teams of the Qualification Group (eight teams total) will play a three round playoff for the remaining spots in international championships. The playoff will be carried out according to the European model, with home and away games except in the final match. Teams are seeded according to their placement.
- The 5th placed team of the Qualification Group will play a relegation playoff against the second placed team of the Challenge League. The last placed team is relegated directly.

The new format will be implemented for the 2023–24 season, while the transitional 2022–23 season will have only the last placed team playing a relegation playoff against the 3rd place of the Challenge League. A change of format for the Swiss Challenge League is not yet clear.

In October 2022, following heavy fan protests, reigning champions FC Zürich officially submitted a request to repeal the decision to introduce the play-off modus. Instead they propose to use the system used in the Scottish Premiership. An according fan petition gathered 18,000 signatures (including national team star Breel Embolo) in the first day of its publication and Super League heavy-weights BSC Young Boys officially supported the motion immediately. This triggered a renewed vote by the general assembly.

On 11 November 2022, the new proposal to instead use the "Scottish Model" was approved by the general assembly of the Swiss Football League. By the time of the vote, the petition opposing the play-off system had gathered over 60,000 signatures. The increased number of teams was not up for a re-vote, though. The new format is as follows:

- In a first phase all twelve teams play each other three times each, for a total of 33 matchdays.
- Following that, the league is split into two groups of six each, one "Championship Group" and one "Relegation Group".
  - Each team will play every other team in their group one time (five matches each), for a total of 38 matchdays.
  - The Championship Group will play for the title of Swiss Football Champion and qualification to European championships.
  - The Relegation Group will play against relegation (last place) and qualification to the relegation play-off (second-to-last place).
- Points won in the first phase are carried over to the second phase.

At the beginning of each season, the Swiss Football Association 'predicts' the likely positions of each club in order to produce a fixture schedule that ensures the best possible chance of all clubs playing each other twice at home and twice away. This is known as the league 'seeding' and is based on clubs' performance in the previous season. If the clubs do not finish in the half where they are predicted to finish, then anomalies can be created in the fixture list. Clubs sometimes play another three times at home and once away (or vice versa), or a club can end up playing 20 home (or away) games in a season

These "Scottish Model" format changes were implemented for the 2023-24 Swiss Super League season, alongside the expansion to 12 teams. Due to the expansion, the 2022-23 season had no automatic relegation spots and two promotion spots in the Swiss Challenge League. There was, however, a promotion/relegation playoff between 3rd in the Challenge League and 12th in the Super League.

== Clubs ==
=== Current season ===
Location of the 2026–27 Super League teams

Club	Location	Stadium	Capacity	Ref
FC Basel	Basel	St. Jakob-Park	37,994	
Grasshopper Club	Zürich	Letzigrund	26,103	
FC Lausanne-Sport	Lausanne	Stade de la Tuilière	12,544	
FC Lugano	Lugano	Stadio Cornaredo	6,390	
FC Luzern	Lucerne	Swissporarena	16,490	
Servette FC	Geneva	Stade de Genève	28,833	
FC Sion	Sion	Stade Tourbillon	14,283	
FC St. Gallen	St. Gallen	Kybunpark	19,455	
FC Thun	Thun	Stockhorn Arena	10,000	
(Liechtenstein) FC Vaduz	Vaduz	Rheinpark Stadion	7,584	
BSC Young Boys	Bern	Stadion Wankdorf	31,120	
FC Zürich	Zürich	Letzigrund	26,103	

=== Promotion/relegation from 2025–26 season ===
- FC Vaduz were promoted directly back as the Challenge League champions, after five seasons in the second tier.
- Winterthur were relegated as the last placed team of Super League, after their four seasons spent in the top flight.
- Grasshopper Club Zürich remain in the Super League, as the winner of the relegation play-off against FC Aarau.

== Team records ==
=== Champions (Super League era) ===
Season	Champions (Super League only)	Runners-up	Third place	Top scorer(s)		
Season	Champions (Super League only)	Runners-up	Third place	Player (Club)	Nat.	Goals
2003–04	Basel	Young Boys	Servette	Stéphane Chapuisat (Young Boys)	(Switzerland)	23
2004–05	Basel (2)	Thun	Grasshopper	Christian Giménez (Basel)	(Argentina)	27
2005–06	Zürich	Basel	Young Boys	Alhassane Keita (Zürich)	(Guinea)	20
2006–07	Zürich (2)	Basel	Sion	Mladen Petrić (Basel)	(Croatia)	19
2007–08	Basel (3)	Young Boys	Zürich	Hakan Yakin (Young Boys)	(Switzerland)	24
2008–09	Zürich (3)	Young Boys	Basel	Seydou Doumbia (Young Boys)	(Ivory Coast)	20
2009–10	Basel (4)	Young Boys	Grasshopper	Seydou Doumbia (Young Boys)	(Ivory Coast)	30
2010–11	Basel (5)	Zürich	Young Boys	Alexander Frei (Basel)	(Switzerland)	27
2011–12	Basel (6)	Luzern	Young Boys	Alexander Frei (Basel)	(Switzerland)	23
2012–13	Basel (7)	Grasshopper	St. Gallen	Ezequiel Scarione (St. Gallen)	(Argentina)	21
2013–14	Basel (8)	Grasshopper	Young Boys	Shkëlzen Gashi (Grasshopper)	(Albania)	19
2014–15	Basel (9)	Young Boys	Zürich	Shkëlzen Gashi (Basel)	(Albania)	22
2015–16	Basel (10)	Young Boys	Luzern	Moanes Dabbur (Grasshopper)	(Israel)	19
2016–17	Basel (11)	Young Boys	Lugano	Seydou Doumbia (Basel)	(Ivory Coast)	20
2017–18	Young Boys	Basel	Luzern	Albian Ajeti (Basel, St. Gallen)	(Switzerland)	17
2018–19	Young Boys (2)	Basel	Lugano	Guillaume Hoarau (Young Boys)	(France)	24
2019–20	Young Boys (3)	St. Gallen	Basel	Jean-Pierre Nsame (Young Boys)	(Cameroon)	32
2020–21	Young Boys (4)	Basel	Servette	Jean-Pierre Nsame (Young Boys)	(Cameroon)	19
2021–22	Zürich (4)	Basel	Young Boys	Jordan Pefok (Young Boys)	(United States)	22
2022–23	Young Boys (5)	Servette	Lugano	Jean-Pierre Nsame (Young Boys)	(Cameroon)	21
2023–24	Young Boys (6)	Lugano	Servette	Žan Celar (Lugano)	(Slovenia)	13
2024–25	Basel (12)	Servette	Young Boys	Xherdan Shaqiri (Basel)	(Switzerland)	18
2025–26	Thun	St. Gallen	Lugano	Christian Fassnacht (Young Boys)	(Switzerland)	18

=== Performance by club ===
Titles	Club	Last Championship won
27	Grasshopper	2003
21	Basel	2025
17	Servette	1999
17	Young Boys	2024
13	Zürich	2022
7	Lausanne-Sport	1965
3	Winterthur	1917
3	Lugano	1949
3	La Chaux-de-Fonds	1964
3	Neuchâtel Xamax	1988
3	Aarau	1993
2	Sion	1997
2	St. Gallen	2000
1	Anglo-American Club Zürich	1899
1	Brühl	1915
1	Étoile-Sporting	1919
1	Biel-Bienne	1947
1	Bellinzona	1948
1	Luzern	1989
1	Thun	2026

=== Performance by club (professional era only) ===
Club	Titles
Grasshopper	19
Basel	18
Young Boys	11
Zürich	10
Servette	10
Lausanne-Sport	5
La Chaux-de-Fonds	3
Lugano	3
Sion	2
Neuchâtel Xamax	2
Bellinzona	1
Aarau	1
Biel-Bienne	1
Luzern	1
St. Gallen	1
Thun	1

=== Performance by club (Super League era only) ===
Club	Titles
Basel	12
Young Boys	6
Zürich	4
Thun	1

== Player records ==
All records are since the introduction of the Super League in 2003.

Players in italics are still active. As of 15 December 2020.

- Most championships: Marco Streller (8 times): 2004, 2008, 2010, 2011, 2012, 2013, 2014, 2015; with FC Basel
- Most appearances: Nelson Ferreira (421 appearances); with FC Thun and FC Luzern
- Most goals overall: all time record: Peter Risi (216 goals), Super League record: Marco Streller (119 goals)
- Most times top scorer: Seydou Doumbia (3 times): 2009 (20 goals), 2010 (30); with BSC Young Boys; 2017 (20); with FC Basel
- Most goals in a season: Jean-Pierre Nsame (32 goals): 2020; with BSC Young Boys
- Most minutes without conceding: Roman Bürki (660 minutes): 2012; with Grasshopper Club
- Fastest perfect hattrick: Mohamed Kader (6 minutes): 31 August 2003; with Servette FC against BSC Young Boys (4–1)
- Oldest player: Andris Vaņins (40 years 3 months 4 days): 3 August 2020; with FC Zürich
- Youngest player: Sascha Studer (15 years 6 months 18 days): 1 April 2007; with FC Aarau
- Oldest goalscorer: Walter Samuel (38 years 21 days): 13 April 2016; with FC Basel against FC Lugano (4–1)
- Youngest goalscorer: Endogan Adili (15 years 9 months 10 days): 13 May 2010; with Grasshopper Club

== See also ==
- Sports league attendances
