= 1898–99 Swiss Serie A =

Swiss football season

Swiss Serie A
- Season: 1898–99

The 1898–99 Swiss Serie A season was the 1898–99 season of the Swiss national football league championship.

== Overview ==
The Swiss championship was played as a knock out competition. It was divided into three regional groups, East (region Zürich) Central (regional north-west Switzerland) and West (Romandy). The winners of each group played the finals in a round-robin tournament.

In group East the Anglo-American Club Zürich were matched against Grasshopper Club Zürich. The game was drawn and thus a replay was required, which was won by the Anglo-American Club. In the next round they played against FC Zürich and won 5-0. They therefore qualified for the finals.

In the central group FC Basel played against Old Boys ending in a draw and so it required a replay as well, which was played a month later and also drawn. Because the Old Boys complained that one of the two FCB goals, in this replay match, had been scored by the players hand they protested. The Swiss Football Association had to deal with the matter and subsequently the protest was approved. The disputed goal simply deducted from the result and thus the Old Boys proceeded to the finals.

In the final play-off group the majority of the English players from Lausanne Football and Cricket Club refused to play the match against the Old Boys because it was scheduled for a Sunday thus forfeiting victory for the Old Boys. This was the first forfeit in Swiss football history. Finally the Anglo-American Club won the championship.

== Qualification groups ==
=== East ===
Club	Score	Club
Anglo-American Club Zürich	3-3	Grasshopper Club Zürich
Anglo-American Club Zürich	2-1	Grasshopper Club Zürich
Anglo-American Club Zürich	5-0	FC Zürich

=== Central ===
Club	Score	Club
BSC Old Boys Basel	1-1	FC Basel
BSC Old Boys Basel	2-1	FC Basel

=== West ===
Club	Score	Club
FC Yverdon	2-0	FC Neuchâtel
Lausanne Football and Cricket Club	4-0	Geneva United
Lausanne Football and Cricket Club	6-2	FC Yverdon

== Finals ==
Club	Score	Club
BSC Old Boys Basel	-	Lausanne Football and Cricket Club
Anglo-American Club	7-0	BSC Old Boys Basel

NB: The British players of Lausanne refused to play on Sunday.

== See also ==
- 1898–99 FC Basel season

== Sources ==
- Switzerland 1898-99 at RSSSF
