= Landhof =

Sports stadium in Basel, Switzerland

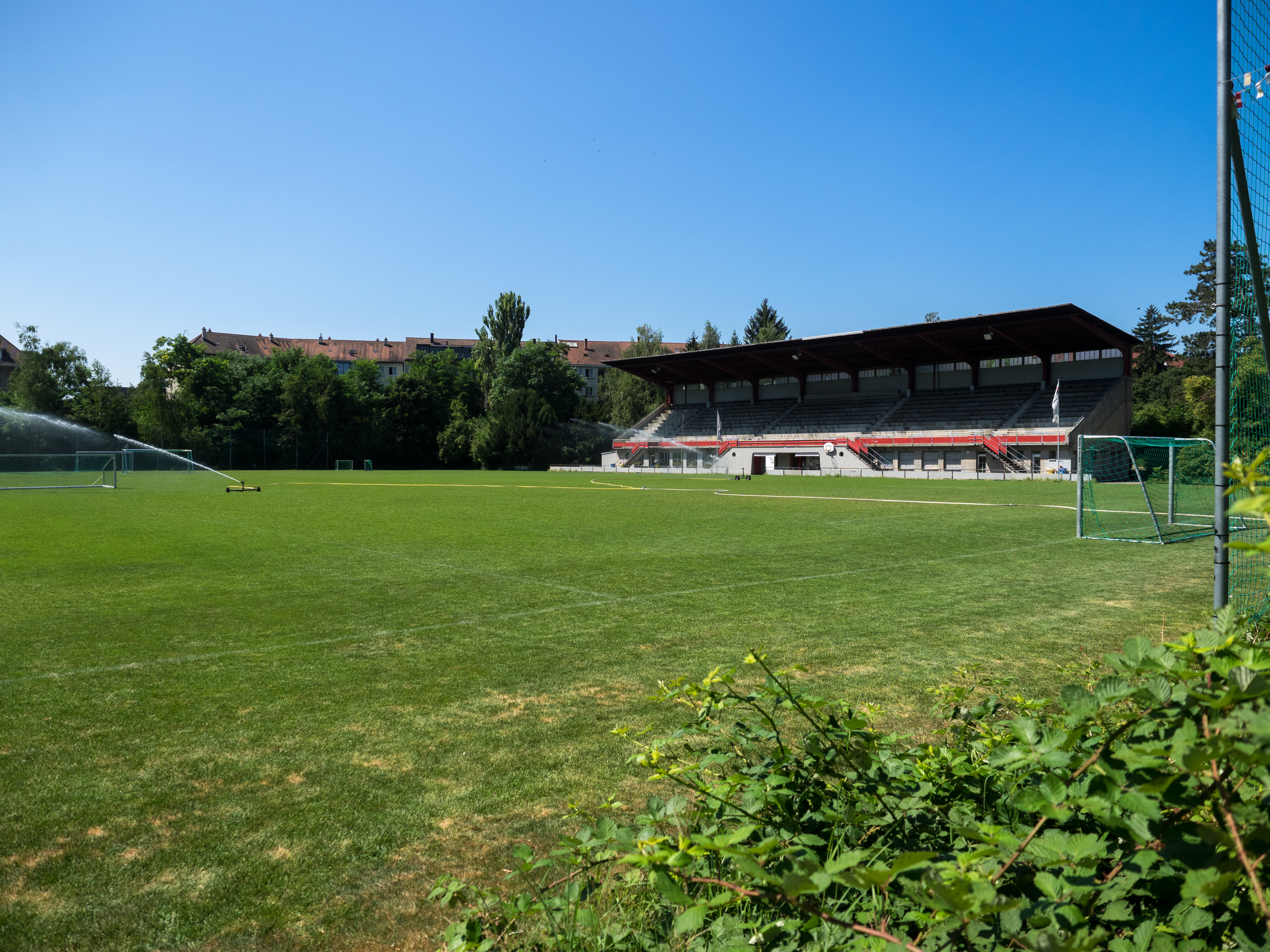
- Landhof Tribuene
- Interactive map of Landhof
- Location: Basel, Switzerland
- Coordinates: 47°33′44″N 7°36′9.49″E
- Capacity: 4'000

Construction
- Built: Second half of the 18th century
- Opened: 26 November 1893
- Closed: 1967

Tenant
- FC Basel (1893–1967)

The Landhof was a sports stadium in the district Basel-Wettstein in Kleinbasel, Basel. It was the former and first home stadium of FC Basel.

It is mentioned for the first time in a chronicle in the second half of the 18th century as a nice summer house with beautiful property. The best known owner of the manor was Andreas Merian-Iselin, a member of the Merian family. He was Mayor of Basel and Landammann of Switzerland (highest office at the time).

In 1892 the granddaughter of Merian-Iselin sold the Landhof to a certain Katharina Ehrler-Wittich. As the Football Club Basel 1893 was founded in 1893 and looked for a ground to play, she made the Landhof available free of charge as a playing surface. As early as Sunday, 26 November 1893, the first football game took place on the grounds. From 1895 to 1901 the Vélodrome de Bâle, a cycle track, was also located on the grounds. In their 1898–99 season, FC Basel's first league game was played here, this was a city derby against BSC Old Boys, in front of nearly 400 spectators.

The first international match between the Swiss national team and the Germany national team took place here in April 1908. The Swiss Football Association demanded a seated spectator stand for at least 200 people. The club agreed and built a wood fence around the ground. Sponsored by a chocolate factory, at the cost of 4,000 Swiss Francs and a building time of little more than one month the club's members built the first spectator grandstand in Switzerland. On 5 April 1908, Switzerland's first international football match against Germany took place on the Landhof in front of 4,000 spectators. Switzerland won 5-3. This was the first international match for Germany and the third for Switzerland. Following this, the ground was used a number of times as international venue.

Until 1967 the Landhof was the home ground of FC Basel. After the signing of Helmut Benthaus as player-coach and with the increasing success of the team, the Landhof became too small for the rising number of spectators. From then onwards FC Basel played their home games in the St. Jakob Stadium. However, until the early 1990s the club continued to use the Landhof as a training ground and as playing field for their youth teams. They also had their offices and clubhouse there. After that the area became overgrown and there was a long-term political struggle over a planned residential block development.
