= Anglo-American Club Zürich =

Association football club

- Full name: Anglo-American Football Club Zürich
- Founded: c. 1884
- Dissolved: 1900
- Ground: Allmend, Zürich
Home colours

Anglo-American Club Zürich (also Anglo-American F.C. Zürich) was a Swiss football club based in Zürich, who are known for being the winners of the first official national football championship (then Serie A) in 1899. The team was composed mainly of a group of English-speaking students of the chemical engineering department at the Federal Polytechnic School.

Their home ground was located at the Allmend, which used to be a meadow in what is now Oerlikon.

== History ==
The club shared close ties with the homonymous rowing team, who consisted of expat students from the same school and were attested as early as 1872. It is them the former borrowed their black-red color scheme from. While it is unclear when the football club emerged, some estimates place their founding year in the 1880s. In any case, their earliest attested game was played against Grasshopper Club in 1886.

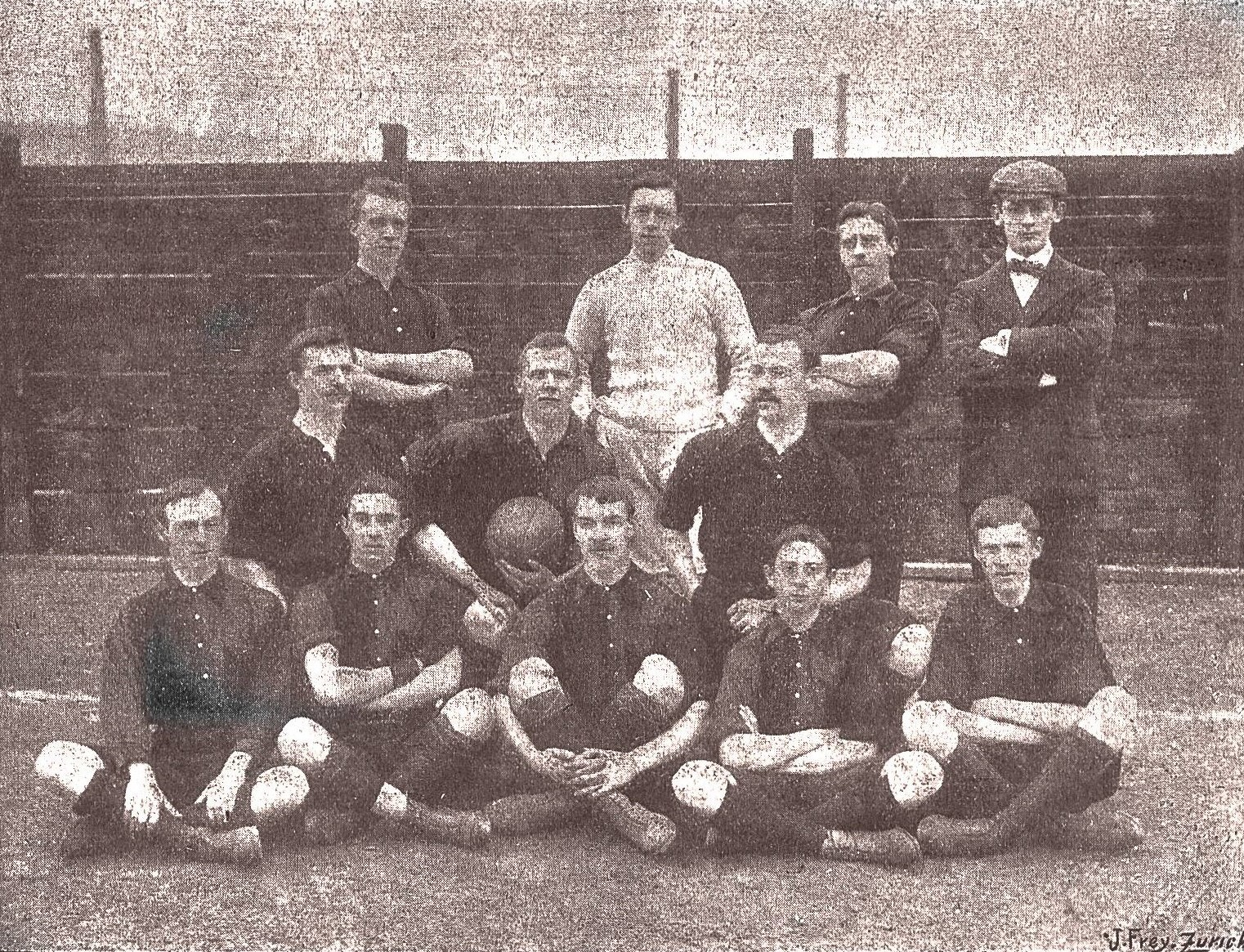
The championship-winning team of 1899

They competed in the inaugural 1898–99 Swiss Serie A season organized by the Swiss Football Association (which several members were also part of), where they were crowned champions after beating Old Boys Basel 7–0 in the finals, winning a prize of 400 francs. In the following season, the club struggled with membership numbers due to its nature as a student association, retaining players for a short amount of time. Nevertheless, they finished 3rd in 1899–1900, but were forced to dissolve in 1900 due to the aforementioned shortage of members. Consequently, certain players moved to teams such as FC Basel and Servette, some of whom eventually joined to form the Anglo-American Wanderers to compete in the 1903–04 season.

== Honours ==
- Swiss Serie A: 1

1899
