= Stadion Schützenmatte =

Sports stadium in Basel, Switzerland

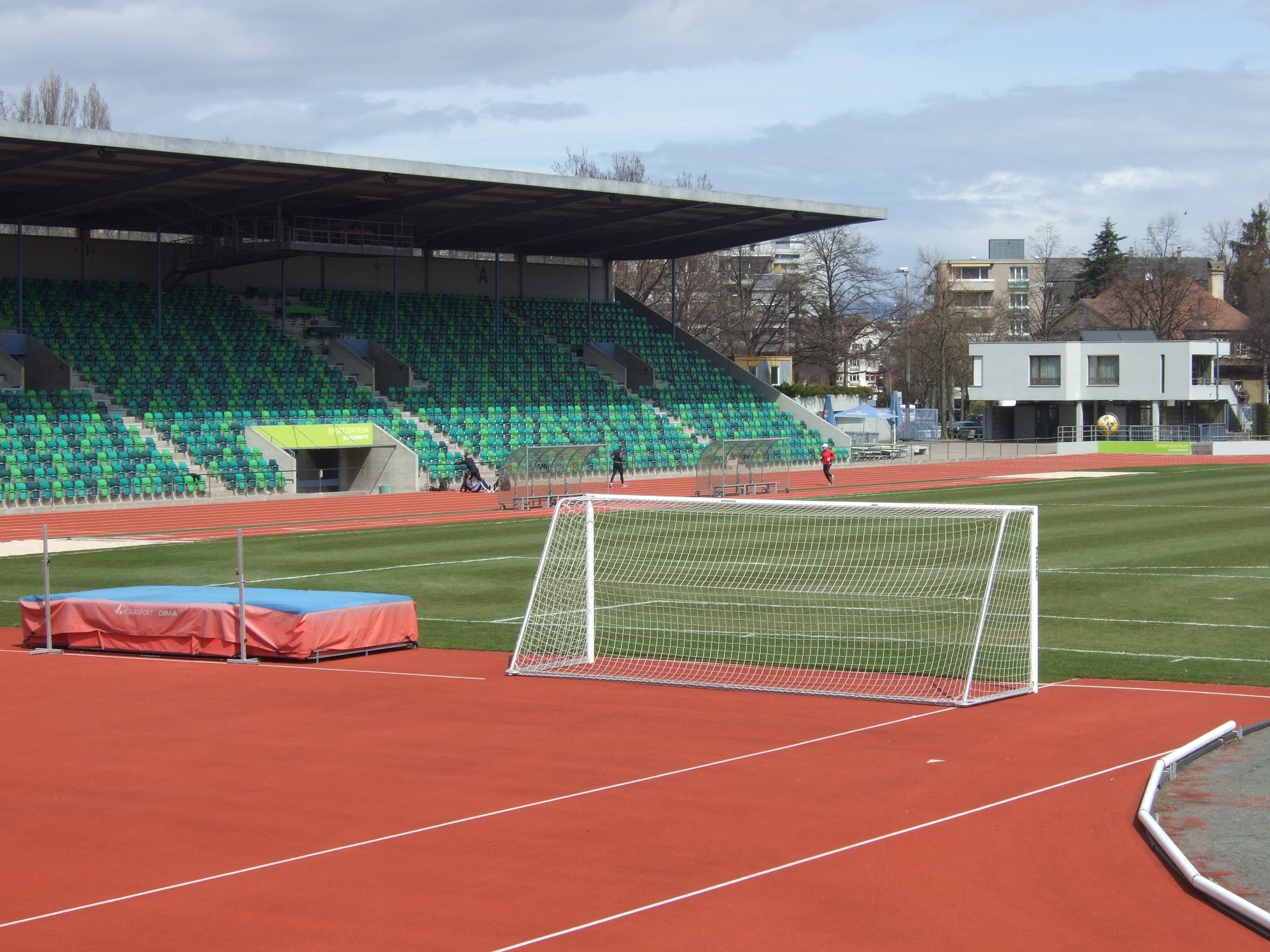
- Interactive map of Stadion Schützenmatte
- Location: Basel, Basel-Stadt, Switzerland
- Coordinates: 47°33′5″N 7°34′26″E
- Owner: Sports Office of Basel-Stadt
- Capacity: 8,000

Tenant
- BSC Old Boys (1. Liga)

Stadion Schützenmatte is a sports stadium with track and field facilities in the Bachletten quartier in Basel, Switzerland. It is the home ground of BSC Old Boys Basel and, together, the pitch and tennis courts make up the western part of the Schützenmatte sports complex. The stadium's capacity is approximately 8,000 (6,000 standing and 2,000 seats), but it can now be increased up to 12,000 people.

During the construction of the St. Jakob-Park, between 1998 and 2001, Stadion Schützenmatte was the temporary home ground of FC Basel.
