= Swiss Football Association =

Governing body of association football in Switzerland

UEFA
- Founded: 7 April 1895; 131 years ago
- Headquarters: Bern, Switzerland
- FIFA affiliation: 1904
- UEFA affiliation: 15 June 1954; 72 years ago
- President: Peter Knäbel
- Website: http://www.football.ch

The Swiss Football Association (German: Schweizerischer Fussballverband; French: Association Suisse de Football; Italian: Associazione Svizzera di Football/Calcio; Romansh: Associaziun Svizra da Ballape) is the governing body of football in Switzerland. Based in Bern, it organises the Swiss Football League and the Switzerland national football team.

It was formed in 1895, was a founder member of FIFA in 1904 and joined UEFA during its foundation year, 1954. FIFA is based in Zurich. Also UEFA is based in the Swiss city of Nyon (near Geneva).

ASF-SFV is the abbreviation of the associations name in three of the national languages of Switzerland. ASF stands for both French (Association Suisse de Football) and Italian (Associazione Svizzera di Football), while SFV is the German (Schweizerischer Fussballverband). In Romansh, it is abbreviated as ASB (Associaziun Svizra da Ballape).

== Origins ==
Switzerland was the first country in Continental Europe to adhere to football, which was introduced in the 1860s by Anglo-Saxon students and teachers from Swiss private schools in the French-speaking part of the country around Lausanne and Geneva, forming teams that initially played a mixture of rugby and football. There is documentation from Geneva that football was played at the Château de Lancy and La Châtelaine institutes in the 1860s. Another club founded by English students was the Lausanne Football and Cricket Club, which was established in 1860, thus being the first football club in Continental Europe, being only three years younger than Sheffield; however, it is likely that Lausanne initially played cricket and only began to practice football in the 1870s.

The oldest Swiss club still in existence, FC St. Gallen, was founded in 1879, by locals from the embroidery industry in German-speaking Switzerland, who had learned about the game from English students; it was followed in 1886 by the Grasshopper Club Zurich. In 1895, Lausanne FCC, St. Gallen, and the Grasshopper Zurich clubs, were among the founding members of the Swiss Football Association. The SFV was one of the seven national associations that founded the world football association FIFA in 1904.

== Presidents ==
- Emil Westermann (1898)
- Max Auckenthaler (1898–1898)
- Paul Kehrli (1898–1899)
- Henri Doll (1899–1900)
- Hans Burckhardt (1900–1901)
- Hans Girsberger (1901–1902)
- Robert Westermann (1902–1903)
- Fritz Curti (1903–1905)
- Hans Enderli (1905–1906)
- Albert Heiniger (1906–1907)
- Paul Buser (1907–1909)
- Louis Berthod (1909–1910)
- Henry Ducommun (1910–1911)
- Henri Tschudi (1911–1912)
- Fritz Curti (1912–1913)
- Adrien Bech (1913–1916)
- Franz Rinderer (1916–1917)
- Fritz Hauser (1917–1920)
- Marcel Henninger (1920–1923)
- Meinrad Ott (1923–1925)
- Jakob Schlegel (1925–1929)
- Otto Eicher (1929–1941)
- Robert Zumbühl (1941–1944)
- Jean Krebs (1944–1947)
- Ernst Thommen (1947–1954)
- Gustav Wiederkehr (1954–1964)
- Victor de Werra (1964–1975)
- Walter Baumann (1975–1983)
- Heinrich Röthlisberger (1983–1989)
- Freddy Rumo (1989–1993)
- Marcel Mathier (1993–2001)
- Ralph Zloczower (2001–2009)
- Peter Gilliéron (2009–2019)
- Dominique Blanc (2019–2025)
- Peter Knäbel (2025–present)
