= 1893–94 FC Basel season =

FC Basel
1893–94 season
- Chairman: Roland Geldner
- First team coach: Ferdinand Isler (as team captain)
- Ground: Landhof, Basel
- No championship this year: n/a (Note: Note League: up until 1898 there was no league football in Switzerland.)
- Top goalscorer: League: n/a All: Wilhelm Glaser (1); H. Siegrist (1)
- Average home league attendance: n/a

FC Basel was started by an advertisement placed by Roland Geldner in the 12 November 1893 edition of the Basler national newspaper, requesting that a football team be formed and that anyone who wished to join should meet up the following Wednesday at 8:15 in the restaurant Schuhmachern-Zunft. Eleven men attended the meeting, generally from the academic community, founding Fussball Club Basel on 15 November 1893. All of them had spent some time in England and during that time found their way into football.

== Founder members ==
(Source: the documentation to the club's 50th anniversary)

- Emil Abderhalden was first team player in the early days, a famous physiologist and head of the physiological institute at the University of Halle in Germany.
- Max Born nearly nothing is known about him or his private life.
- Josy Ebinger was long-time player in the first team. He was active as a club official in various offices, club chairman in 1896 and again from October 1902 to May 1903. He was vice president of the Swiss Football Association in 1900.
- Max Geldner played at least six games for the club's first team in the first two years and was still a loyal friend and a patron of FC Basel 50 years later.
- Roland Geldner was the first president of FC Basel. He was a well-known personality in the city and football player from the early days of football. A distinguished person, he was the soul of the club in the early years.
- Wilhelm Glaser wore the red and blue colors as a center forward for years, played at least 14 matches. He was still follower, with great interest, of the FC Basel activities 50 years later
- Jean Grieder was first and second team player, with at least one match for the first team. He was asset and liability manager and became the clubs first actuary. For years he held high honorary positions in his hometown.
- Ferdinand Isler was a professor at the canton school in Frauenfeld. He was the first team's first captain, played at least 17 games during the club's first three seasons. He later became actuary of the club. He was a great propagandist and was publicist. He wrote brochures about the football game and translated the English rules of the game into German. He was one of the first sports journalists in Switzerland.
- Wilhelm Oser was pharmacist by profession. His cheerful, spirited manner was highly valued in the club. An avid pioneer of the football movement.
- Fritz Schäublin for many years he was the highly respected rector of the humanistic grammar school in Basel. With his excellent skills he served the club in various offices for many years. He was an excellent player in the early days, played four matches in the club's first two season. He was founder of the tennis department.
- Lucien Schmoll nothing is known about him or his private life.
- Richard Strub was a still and quite person, he was loyal member of the club. Very little is known about his private life.
- John Tollmann was businessman and owned his own company John Tollmann & Co, a tea company and had a tea plantations in Ceylon (Sri Lanka). He was a proficient goalkeeper and played at least 23 matches during the club's first five years. He was the first secretary-treasurer of the Swiss Football Association. A personality with a very special character. Together with Roland Geldner, he was the club's driving force in the early days.
- Charlie Volderauer was businessman and had good connections and used them from the very beginning. He was an excellent defender and played at least 33 matches. He was the club's chairman from December 1896 to December 1899. He later arranged the first games in Switzerland against English professional teams Newcastle United and Celtic Glasgow. A rarely eager club member.

Apart from Abderhalden, Born, Schmoll and Strub, they were all members of the Basel rowing club. The club colors red and blue were chosen out of affection for the rowing clubs' colours.

== Overview ==
Eleven days after the club was founded the first game took place. Not much has been passed down from the first game that the FCB played on 26 November 1893. The club members met at the Landhof and played a game among themselves. It is considered as the first, but unofficial, game of FC Basel. The names of the players of both teams were recorded at that time, which can also be read in the annals of FC Basel, and the result was also passed on for posterity, Team 1: with the brothers Roland, Max and Georges Geldner, Ferdinand Isler, Max Born, Josy Ebinger and Fritz Schäublin, beat Team 2: with John Tollmann, Adolf Hintermann, Wilhelm Glaser, Richard Strub, Mario Arbini, Emil Abderhalden, Lewis Gough and Jean Grieder by seven goals to two. At a meeting of the club's leading commission it is said that Isler had very good goal scoring tactics.

Two weeks after this internal training match, the real premiere took place. Ferdinand Isler was selected as the team's first captain. The first football match that the club held was on 10 December against the football team of the club RTV/Realschüler-Turnverein (secondary school student gymnastics club). FCB won two goals to nil, the goal scorers were Glaser and Siegrist.

The next match was held six months later. Charles Volderauer, who as businessman had good connections, used them from the very beginning. As early as June 1894, he organised the journey to visit Strassburger FV. The team travelled by train to Strasbourg and played their first match against a foreign team, which ended with a 0–8 defeat.

Up until the club's AGM on 31 August 1994 a total of 31 footballers had joined the team since the first day, six members had since left and so they had 25 active footballers.

== Players ==
Note: Flags indicate national team as defined under FIFA eligibility rules; some limited exceptions apply. Players may hold more than one non-FIFA nationality.

No.	Pos.	Nation	Player
—	GK	SUI	John Tollmann
—	DF	SUI	Josy Ebinger
—	DF	SUI	Carl Albert Hintermann
—	DF	SUI	Ferdinand Isler
—	DF	SUI	Charles Volderauer
—	FW	SUI	Roland Geldner
—	FW	SUI	Wilhelm Glaser
—	FW	SUI	Emanuel Schiess
—		SUI	Emil Abderhalden
—			Ch. Bielefeld
—		SUI	Max Born
—		NED	F. H. de Boer
—		SUI	Georges Geldner
—		SUI	Max Geldner
—		SUI	Wilhelm Götz

No.	Pos.	Nation	Player
—		ENG	Charles Gough
—		ENG	Lewis Gough
—			Jean Grieder
—			Charles Jörger
—			O. Lindenmann
—			Dr. W. Oser
—		SUI	Dr. Fritz Schäublin
—			Edmond Schmoll
—			Lucien Schmoll
—			Richard Strub
—			Mario Arbini
—			Adolf Hintermann
—			Emil Kollmann
—			Aug. Schetty
—		SUI	H. Siegrist
—			Wilh. Weber

== Results ==
Legend

Win Loss

=== Friendly matches ===
10 December 1893 Friendly	Basel	2–0	RTV Basel	Landhof, Basel
10:40	Glaser (1:0); Siegrist (2:0)	Summary

17 June 1894 Friendly	Strassburger FV	8–0	Basel	Strassburg
15:00	Goal	Summary

== See also ==
- History of FC Basel
- List of FC Basel players
- List of FC Basel seasons

== Notes ==
=== Sources ===
- Rotblau: Jahrbuch Saison 2014/2015. Publisher: FC Basel Marketing AG. ISBN 978-3-7245-2027-6
- Die ersten 125 Jahre. Publisher: Josef Zindel im Friedrich Reinhardt Verlag, Basel. ISBN 978-3-7245-2305-5
- FCB squad 1893–1894 at fcb-archiv.ch

(NB: Despite all efforts, the editors of these books and the authors in "Basler Fussballarchiv" have failed to be able to identify all the players, their date and place of birth or date and place of death, who played in the games during the early years of FC Basel.)
