= 1895–96 FC Basel season =

FC Basel
1895–96 season
- Chairman: Roland Geldner; Emanuel Schiess
- First team coach: Ferdinand Isler (as team captain)
- Ground: Landhof, Basel and Stadion Schützenmatte, Basel
- No championship this year: (Note: League: up until 1898 there was no league football in Switzerland.)
- Top goalscorer: n/a
- Average home league attendance: n/a

The FC Basel 1895–96 season was their third season since the club's foundation on 15 November 1893. Emanuel Schiess was elected as second chairman in the club's history at the club's AGM. FC Basel's home ground was the Landhof, in the Wettstein neighborhood of Kleinbasel (lesser Basel), but they also played home games at the Stadion Schützenmatte in the Bachletten quartier in Grossbasel (greater Basel). The Swiss national championships had not yet been called to into life.

== Overview ==
Roland Geldner had been the club's chairman, but he stood down at the club's AGM held on 1 September 1895 and Emanuel Schiess was elected as new chairman. At this AGM on it was announced that 31 footballers had joined the club since the first day, 14 members had since left and so they had 17 active footballers.

The Swiss Football Association (ASF-SFV) was founded on 7 April 1895. FC Basel were founder members, although they were not present at the founder meeting. Basel goalkeeper and local businessman John Tollmann joined the ASF-SFV board of directors and was the first secretary-treasurer. Local rivals Old Boys were soon to become ASF-SFV members. The idea of a Swiss national championship following the form of the English championship was discussed as priority.

Ferdinand Isler was selected as team captain, he was responsible for leading the team trainings and choosing the player line-ups. For this season club organised ten friendly matches for their first team. Six of these matches were held in Basel, two in the Landhof, two on the Schützenmatte and from the other two games the playing fields are uncertain. In the autumn season Basel played twice against FC Excelsior Zürich, were defeated away and drew at home and in the spring they played them again twice and managed two victories. Basel played twice against French team FC Mulhouse, drawing away and winning at home. They also played twice against Grasshopper Club and won both games. Last season the team had lost the game against Buckjumpers Club Basel, this season they won the revenge. But the Buckjumpers were to dissolve their club at the end of the season, due to lack of members and therefore a number of their remaining members joined Basel before the beginning of the following season.

At the end of November 1895 Basel also played their very first game against Anglo-American Club Zürich, the game ended with a defeat. The ten games ended with six victories, two draws and two defeats. The team scored 18 scored goals and 15 conceded. (Note: Scorers: many pre-First World War game sheets no longer exist or are incomplete and so, many line ups and most goal scorers in this period remain unknown.)

== Players ==
Note: Flags indicate national team as defined under FIFA eligibility rules; some limited exceptions apply. Players may hold more than one non-FIFA nationality.

No.	Pos.	Nation	Player
—	GK	(Switzerland) SUI	Adolf Rittmann
—	DF	(Switzerland) SUI	Otto Bossart
—	DF	(Switzerland) SUI	Josy Ebinger
—	DF	(Switzerland) SUI	Christian Heyd
—	DF	(Switzerland) SUI	Carl Albert Hintermann
—	DF	(Switzerland) SUI	Ferdinand Isler
—	DF	(Germany) GER	Erwin Schricker
—	DF	(Switzerland) SUI	Charles Volderauer
—	FW		S. A. de Clerk
—	FW	(Switzerland) SUI	Roland Geldner
—	FW	(Switzerland) SUI	Wilhelm Glaser
—	FW	(Switzerland) SUI	W. Huber
—	FW		A. Kohts

No.	Pos.	Nation	Player
—	FW	(Switzerland) SUI	Emanuel Schiess
—		(Germany) GER	Ivo Schricker
—			Henry Devick
—		(Switzerland) SUI	Joan Gamper
—		(Switzerland) SUI	Wilhelm Götz
—		(Switzerland) SUI	Hans Koch
—		(Switzerland) SUI	Albert Linder
—		(Switzerland) SUI	Heinrich Preiswerk
—		(Switzerland) SUI	J. Schneider
—		(Switzerland) SUI	H. Siegrist
—		(Switzerland) SUI	Fr. Stauber
—		(Switzerland) SUI	John Tollmann
—			R. C. Vanorden

== Results ==
Legend

Win Draw Loss

=== Friendly matches ===
==== Autumn season ====
29 September 1895 Friendly	Basel	1 – 0	Buckjumpers Club Basel	Landhof, Basel
	Schiess	Summary		Referee: F. H. de Boer

3 November 1895 Friendly	FC Excelsior Zürich	5 – 0	Basel	Allmend Brunau, (FC Zürich)
15:00	Goal	Summary

17 November 1895 Friendly	Basel	2 – 1	Grasshopper Club	Stadion Schützenmatte, Basel
	Glaser (1:0); Glaser (2:1)	Summary	(1:1) E. A. Westermann	Referee: Carl Hintermann (FC Basel)
Note: For FCB Ivo Schricker from Strasbourg FV played as guest player. An FCB player injured himself in the second half and, with the consent of GC, was substituted.

23 November 1895 Friendly	Basel	0 – 1	Anglo-American Club Zürich	Basel
		Summary	(0:1) Morris	Referee: Fritz Schäublin, (FC Basel)

1 December 1895 Friendly	Basel	2 – 2	FC Excelsior Zürich	Landhof, Basel
	Goal	Summary	Goal	Referee: Carl Albert Hintermann (FC Basel)

==== Spring season ====
1 March 1896 Friendly	FC Mulhouse	1 – 1	Basel	Mulhouse
	Goal	Summary	Goal

8 March 1896 Friendly	Grasshopper Club	1 – 3	Basel	Zürich
	Schwarzenbach (1:0)	Summary	(1:1) (1:2) (1:3)

23 March 1896 Friendly	Basel	3 – 2	FC Mulhouse	Stadion Schützenmatte Basel
15:00	(1:0) (2:0) (3:2)	Summary	(2:1) (2:2)	Referee: Carl Albert Hintermann (FC Basel)

12 April 1896 Friendly	Basel	3 – 0	FC Excelsior Zürich	Basel
10:30	(1:0) (2:0) (3:0)	Summary		Referee: Reynolds, Basel

26 April 1896 Friendly	FC Excelsior Zürich	2 – 3	Basel	Zürich
10:30	Goal	Summary	Goal
Note: The result of this match was also reported as 0–3

== See also ==
- History of FC Basel
- List of FC Basel players
- List of FC Basel seasons

== Notes ==
=== Sources ===
- Rotblau: Jahrbuch Saison 2014/2015. Publisher: FC Basel Marketing AG. ISBN 978-3-7245-2027-6
- Die ersten 125 Jahre. Publisher: Josef Zindel im Friedrich Reinhardt Verlag, Basel. ISBN 978-3-7245-2305-5
- FCB squad 1895–1896 at fcb-archiv.ch

(NB: Despite all efforts, the editors of these books and the authors in "Basler Fussballarchiv" have failed to be able to identify all the players, their date and place of birth or date and place of death, who played in the games during the early years of FC Basel. Much match documentation for this season is missing.)
