= 1894–95 FC Basel season =

FC Basel
1894–95 season
- Chairman: Roland Geldner
- First team coach: Ferdinand Isler (as team captain)
- Ground: Landhof, Basel
- No championship this year: n/a (Note: Note League: up until 1898 there was no league football in Switzerland.)
- Top goalscorer: n/a (Note: Note Scorers: many pre-First World War game sheets no longer exist or are incomplete and so, many line ups and most goal scorers in this period remain unknown.)
- Average home league attendance: n/a

The FC Basel 1894–95 season was their second season, as the club's foundation was on 15 November 1893. Roland Geldner was the club's first chairman remained as chairman. FC Basel played their home games in the Landhof, in the Wettstein neighborhood of Kleinbasel (lesser Basel). The Swiss national championships had not yet been called to into life.

== Overview ==
Ferdinand Isler was selected as team captain, he was responsible for leading the team trainings and choosing the player line-ups. During the summer the players of FC Basel attended the RTV/Realschüler-Turnverein (secondary school student gymnastics club) football training sessions to prepare for their first meeting with the then already prestigious Grasshopper Club Zürich. Gymnastics teacher Adolf Glaz, who had founded the RTV, had introduced his students to the new football game in 1893.

On 21 October 1894 Basel played their first game in the city on the Limmat, which was very positively commentated by GC in the local newspaper: It really deserves credit for the fact that they dare to travel so far, despite their short existence. Our colleagues in Basel have the same principles as we do. They find that one can only learn the game properly through playing many matches and possibly suffering defeats. Therefore, we pay the highest appreciation to the young club, that has to make significant sacrifices in order to achieve this aim. Despite all expressions of respect, the game on the Zurich swamp-like underground ended with a 0–4 defeat for Basel. After the heated fight between the two teams, the guests were entertained and then accompanied by the hosts to an evening drink and finally to the train station. Because of this, the FCB players looked forward to the return match against GC two weeks later. Over a dozen members gathered at the train station in Basel to accompany the guests through the city and to have a "morning pint" before the match. The spectators were shown an attractive game, which FCB only lost 0–4, they had improved compared to the first leg. It was noteworthy that Basel put the ball in the opponents goal twice before half time, but the both goals fell from an offside position. As in Zürich two weeks earlier, in Basel too, after the game they treated themselves to a dinner and the opponents were also accompanied back to the train station.

For this season club organised ten friendly matches for their first team. The first was a match against FC Gymnasia (from the Greek "gymnasion": place of physical training) a team formed by gymnasts and junior high school students and in 1884 the first football was purchased for their gymnastics lessons. Before and between the two games against Grasshopper Club, Basel played two games against RTV. These were their second and third comparisons and they were all quite rough fights. In the autumn Basel were hosts to FC Excelsior Zürich, the second well established club from Zürich. The return match was played during the spring and attracted over 2,000 spectators, a respectable number because at that time the city that had about 70,000 inhabitants. They were also hosts to locals Buckjumpers Club Basel, another club formed by gymnastic and high school students, and were hosts to French team FC Mulhouse, who were to become a regular friendly opponent in the next few years.

Another team to guest in Basel was the German team Karlsruher FC Kickers. The Kickers had played against the FC Old Boys Basel that morning and won 10–0. The Karlsruher FC Kickers competed with only four of their own players, the remaining seven were players from three other Karlsruhe clubs, so it was actually a Karlsruhe selection. An explanation to this is, among the oldest football clubs in Karlsruhe were the International Football Club (1889), who later merged with the Karlsruher FV (1891) and the FC Karlsruher Kickers (1893). These later merged with the Karlsruher FC Phönix (1894) and these tams were all predecessor clubs of today's Karlsruher SC.

In May there was a game against Abstinenten-Fussballclub Patria Basel and the first game against newly formed FC Old Boys Basel.

== Players ==
Note: Flags indicate national team as defined under FIFA eligibility rules; some limited exceptions apply. Players may hold more than one non-FIFA nationality.

No.	Pos.	Nation	Player
—	GK	SUI	Adolf Rittmann
—	DF	SUI	Otto Bossart
—	DF	SUI	Josy Ebinger
—	DF	SUI	Christian Heyd
—	DF	SUI	Carl Albert Hintermann
—	DF	SUI	Ferdinand Isler
—	DF	SUI	Charles Volderauer
—	FW	SUI	Roland Geldner
—	FW	SUI	Wilhelm Glaser
—	FW	SUI	Emanuel Schiess
—		SUI	Emil Abderhalden

No.	Pos.	Nation	Player
—		SUI	Max Born
—		NED	F. H. de Boer
—		GER	K. Ehmann
—		SUI	Max Geldner
—		SUI	Wilhelm Götz
—		SUI	F. Moormann
—		SUI	Hans Müry
—		SUI	Heinrich Preiswerk
—		SUI	Fritz Schäublin
—		SUI	H. Siegrist
—		SUI	John Tollmann

== Results ==
Legend

Win Draw Loss

=== Friendly matches ===
==== Autumn season ====
22 September 1894 Friendly	Basel	2–0	FC Gymnasia	Stadion Schützenmatte, Basel
14:00	Goal	Summary
Note: FCB played with ten men and it is said to have had two loan players from Gymnasial FC in their ranks. But there are different reports about this game. According to another game report, a total of 19 players played, some of which are said to have joined during the course of the game. Whereby, according to this report it is said that FCB loaned some players to Gymnasial FC.

14 October 1894 Friendly	Basel	0–0	RTV/Realschüler-Turnverein	Basel
10:30		Summary		Referee: Hans Müry (FC Basel)
Note: FCB players Josy Ebinger and Christian Heyd were loaned to RTV for this match

21 October 1894 Friendly	Grasshopper Club	4–0	Basel	Zürich
13:10	(1:0) (2:0) (3:0); Schwarzenbach (4:0)	Summary		Referee: Cotton, (FC Zürich)

28 October 1894 Friendly	Basel	1–1	RTV/Realschüler-Turnverein	Landhof, Basel
10:40	Schäublin 37' (1:1)	Summary	10' (0:1) Burkhardt	Referee: Ferdinand Isler (FC Basel)
Note: FCB player Max Born was loaned to RTV for this match

4 November 1894 Friendly	Basel	0–3	Grasshopper Club	Basel
14:30		Summary	Goal	Referee: (Switzerland) John Tollmann (FC Basel)

18 November 1894 Friendly	Basel	0–2	FC Excelsior Zürich	Stadion Schützenmatte, Basel
14:30		Summary	52' (0:1) Heinrich; 67' (0:2) Drossel	Attendance: 2,000; Referee: Fritz Schäublin (FC Basel)

25 November 1894 Friendly	Basel	1–2	Buckjumpers Club Basel	Basel
	Goal	Summary	Goal

2 December 1894 Friendly	Basel	5–0	FC Mulhouse	Stadion Schützenmatte, Basel
14:15	Schiess (1:0); Schiess (2:0); Schiess (3:0); Schiess (4:0); Siegrist (5:0)	Summary		Referee: F. H. de Boer, (FC Basel)

==== Spring season ====
31 March 1895 Friendly	Basel	1–1	Karlsruher FC Kickers	Stadion Schützenmatte, Basel
14:30	(1:0)	Summary	(1:1)	Referee: (FC Basel)
Note: The Karlsruher FC Kickers competed with only four of their own players, the remaining seven were players from three other Karlsruhe clubs, so it was actually a Karlsruhe selection. The kickers played against the Old Boys that morning and won 10–0, so they were already somewhat tired. The game is rated 1–1 in the FCB season balance sheet, a goal by the Kickers was not recognized by FCB. In the sports press it is rated as 1–2. In a match report from the Süddeutsche Fußball Zeitung, there is a player named Alexander in the FCB players list, however, at that time the FCB did not have a player with either that first or surname in their squad.

7 April 1895 Friendly	FC Excelsior Zürich	1–1	Basel	Zürich
	Heinrich (1:0)	Summary	(1:1) Moormann

5 May 1895 Friendly	Basel	2–0	Abstinenten FC Patria Basel	Stadion Schützenmatte, Basel
17:30	(1:0) (2:0)	Summary
Note: FCB played with ten men

19 May 1895 Friendly	Basel	6–0	Old Boys	Basel
17:30	Moormann; Geldner; Schiess	Summary		Referee: Fritz Schäublin (FC Basel)

== See also ==
- History of FC Basel
- List of FC Basel players
- List of FC Basel seasons

== Notes ==
=== Sources ===
- Rotblau: Jahrbuch Saison 2014/2015. Publisher: FC Basel Marketing AG. ISBN 978-3-7245-2027-6
- Die ersten 125 Jahre. Publisher: Josef Zindel im Friedrich Reinhardt Verlag, Basel. ISBN 978-3-7245-2305-5
- FCB squad 1894–1895 at fcb-archiv.ch

(NB: Despite all efforts, the editors of these books and the authors in "Basler Fussballarchiv" have failed to be able to identify all the players, their date and place of birth or date and place of death, who played in the games during the early years of FC Basel.)
