= History of FC Basel =

Swiss football club history

Fussball Club Basel 1893 has a history that spans the period from 1893 to the present day. Having competed at the highest level of football in Switzerland for most of this time, FCB currently play in the Swiss Super League. The club was founded on 15 November 1893. At first the club played their home games in the Landhof stadium. During the mid-1960s they played their games in St. Jakob Stadium which was demolished in 1998. During the construction of the new stadium, between 1998 and 2001, the Stadion Schützenmatte was the club's temporary home ground. Since 2001 Basel play home games at St. Jakob-Park, which is currently the largest club stadium in Switzerland.

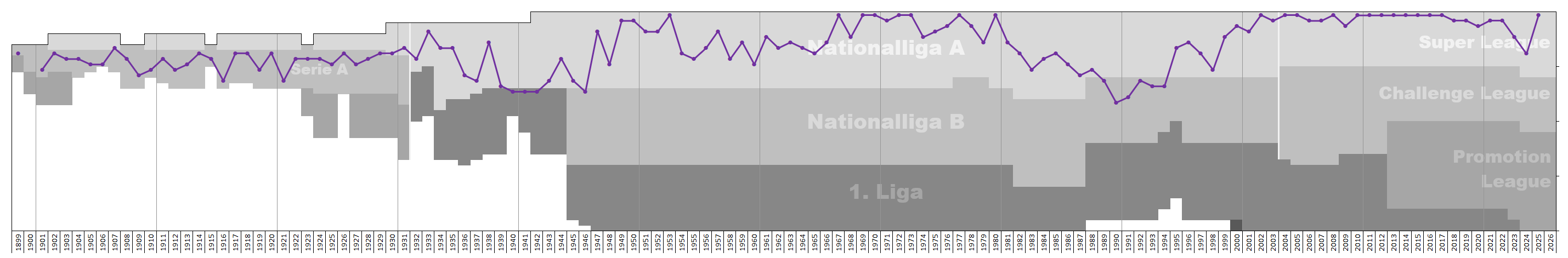
Chart of FC Basel table positions in the Swiss football league system

== The history ==
The Basel Coat of Arms, FC Basel's Original logo

Due to its size the history of FC Basel has been divided into four sections. For details on individual periods of the club's history, see the following articles:

- History of FC Basel (1893–1939)

The first section deals with the club's foundation the early years, including the forming of the Swiss Football Association, the first league and cup competitions, the clubs first silverware, the First World War, the interwar period and the club's first relegation.

- History of FC Basel (1939–1965)

The second section starts with relegation, no promotion, missed promotion, promotion after all, another relegation, another promotion and the second cup title. It then spans the period of Jules Düblin as chairman, the first championship title and the third cup win.

- History of FC Basel (1965–2000)

The third section deals with the era Benthaus, seven domestic league titles, the subsequent decline, relegation, six seasons of second-tier football and the long-awaited promotion.

- History of FC Basel (2000–present)

The fourth section deals with the financial backing that had been put into the club at that time, the move to the new stadium St. Jakob-Park, how success returned and how things have progressed to the present day.

== Foundation ==
FC Basel was started by an advertisement placed by Roland Geldner in the 12 November 1893 edition of the Basler national newspaper, requesting that a football team be formed and that anyone who wished to join should meet up the following Wednesday at 8:15 in the restaurant Schuhmachern-Zunft. Eleven men attended the meeting, generally from the academic community, founding Fussball Club Basel on 15 November 1893.

== Founder members ==
(Source: the documentation to the club's 50th anniversary)

- Emil Abderhalden was first team player in the early days, a famous physiologist and head of the physiological institute at the University of Halle in Germany.
- Max Born nothing is known about his private life.
- Josy Ebinger was long-time player in the first team. He was active as a club official in various offices, club chairman from October 1902 to May 1903. He was vice president of the Swiss Football Association in 1900.
- Max Geldner played at least six games for the club's first team in the first two years and was still a loyal friend and a patron of FC Basel 50 years later.
- Roland Geldner was the first president of FC Basel. He was a well-known personality in the city and football player from the early days of football. A distinguished person, he was the soul of the club in the early years.
- Wilhelm Glaser wore the red and blue colors as a center forward for years, played at least 14 matches. He was still follower with great interest of the FC Basel activities 50 years later
- Jean Grieder was first and second team player, with at least one match for the first team. He was asset and liability manager and became the club's first actuary. For years he held high honorary positions in his hometown.
- Ferdinand Isler was a professor at the canton school in Frauenfeld. He was the first team's first captain, played at least 17 games during the club's first three seasons. He later became actuary of the club. He was a great propagandist. He wrote brochures about the football game and translated the English rules of the game into German. He was one of the first sports journalists.
- Wilhelm Oser was pharmacist by profession. His cheerful, spirited manner was highly valued in the club. An avid pioneer of the football movement.
- Fritz Schäublin for many years he was the highly respected rector of the humanistic grammar school in Basel. With his excellent skills he served the club in various offices for many years. He was an excellent player in the early days, played four matches in the club's first two season. He was founder of the tennis department.
- Lucien Schmoll nothing is known about his private life.
- Richard Strub was still and quite, loyal member of the club. Very little is known about his private life.
- John Tollmann was a proficient goalkeeper and played at least 23 matches during the club's first five years. He was the first secretary-treasurer of the Swiss Football Association. A personality with a very special character. Together with Roland Geldner, he was the club's driving force in the early days.
- Charlie Volderauer was an excellent defender and played at least 33 matches. He was president December 1896 to December 1899. Arranged the first games in Switzerland against English professionals: Newcastle United and Celtic Glasgow. A rarely eager club member.

== See also ==
- FC Basel
- List of FC Basel players
- List of FC Basel seasons
- Football in Switzerland
- Category:FC Basel
- Category:FC Basel players
