= History of FC Basel (1893–1939) =

The history of Fussball Club Basel 1893 spans from its founding on 15 November 1893 to the present. The club's history is currently divided into four sections. This section covers the club from its foundation to the beginning of the Second World War. During this time, Basel won silverware twice: the Anglo Cup in 1913 and the Swiss Cup in 1933 but were also relegated in 1939. For other periods of the club's history, see the following articles:

- History of FC Basel (1939–1965)
- History of FC Basel (1965–2000)
- History of FC Basel (2000–present)

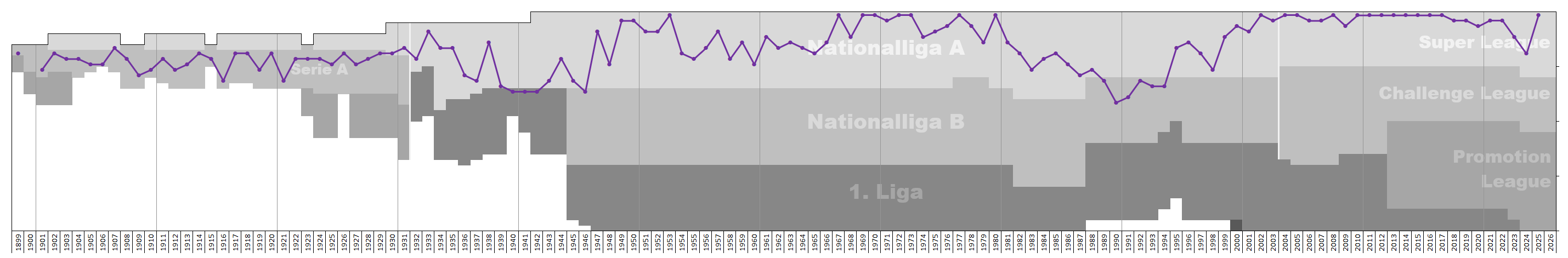
Chart of FC Basel table positions in the Swiss football league system

The Basel Coat of Arms, FC Basel's original logo.

== Establishment and early years (1893–1898) ==
On November 12, 1893, Swiss businessman Roland Geldner placed an advertisement in the newspaper National-Zeitung seeking football enthusiasts interested in founding a football club. Geldner, his brother Max Geldner and ten other men who responded to the advertisement met three days later and founded Fussball Club Basel. Notable among the founding members were Josy Ebinger and John Tollmann, who would both go on to have key roles in the Swiss Football Association, and Ferdinand Isler, Basel's initial team captain. The club's first game was held against RTV 1879 Basel on December 10, with Basel winning 2–0. The club's only other match of the season was held six months later, with founding member Charlie Volderauer organising a visit to Strassburger FV; Basel lost 8–0.

As a Swiss league had not yet been established, Basel played only sporadic friendly matches for the next four years with mixed success. In this period, the Swiss Football Association was established with a key objective being to establish a league. An unofficial championship took place in the 1897–98 season, though Basel did not take part.

== Beginnings of the league (1898–1909) ==
The first iteration of the Swiss League took place in the 1898–99 season as a knockout competition divided geographically. Basel played Old Boys, another Basel-based side. The first game was a draw, leading to a rematch that was also initially considered a 2–2 draw. However, Old Boys filed a complain with the Swiss Football Association that one of Basel's goals should have been ruled a handball; the protest was upheld, leading to the final scoreline being 2–1 to Old Boys and eliminating Basel. Basel did not participate in the league the next season, but returned to the league in 1900–01 playing in the East group. The new competition used a double round-robin format, though Basel experienced little success as they won just two of their ten fixtures. The club's largest ever defeat took place in this season, when they lost 13–3 away to Grasshopper Club.

Basel's ground, the Landhof, had been shared between Basel and a cycling club which used a track laid outside the boundary of the football pitch. The cycling club dissolved in 1901, which caused the owner of the land to search for a new tenant as Basel had been allowed to play on the football ground for free. The new tenant was a bowling club that needed concrete lanes, which left the football field unusable and forced Basel to find a new ground. The club moved about eight kilometres to the south side of the Rhine to a field adjacent to BSC Old Boys. The players moved the goal posts and crossbars by hand due to the club's limited funds. The change of ground beckoned in a much more successful season in which Basel finished second in the five-team Central group, just one point short of BSC Young Boys. The following season was not quite as successful for the club, as they placed third in the league, though they were able to move back to the Landhof at the end of 1902 after paying a fee of 150 francs to the owner in order to remove the bowling alley.

By 1903, Basel had grown to be Switzerland's second largest football club, with over 40 footballers and 70 patrons. Basel finished third in the greatly uneven 1903–1904 season, with both Old Boys and Young Boys dominating the division, FC Biel-Bienne being uncompetitive and Fortuna Basel collapsing mid-season. The following season was disappointing for Basel as they came fourth in the five-team division. The Central division had only four teams in 1905 and led to an increase in competitive games. Basel defeated Old Boys home and away, but lost in both fixtures played against Young Boys and FC Bern. However, Basel had a bumper 1906–07 season, winning six of their eight games and tying with Old Boys for first in the division. This forced a playoff to see who would play the other division champions. The first game was a draw, forcing a replay with was also a draw, but Basel won the third game 4–1. While the historical record is incomplete, fourteen of Basel's thirty-eight goals in competitive fixtures have been attributed to a player, with five of the fourteen coming from Karl Gossweiler. The Central division was abolished for the next two season, splitting the clubs; Basel moved to the East division which now had eight clubs. In both these seasons, Basel finished in mid-table positions while FC Winterthur won the league.

== Anglo Cup era and First World War (1909–1918) ==
The Central division returned for the 1909–10 season, which reduced the number of league games and led to the team increasing the number of friendlies they played. Though they finished second-last in the group, the season was highly competitive; Basel were only three points off the champions. More notable was the establishment of the Anglo Cup, the first of three cup competitions that would exist at the summit of Swiss football. Basel won their first game against Young Fellows Zürich but lost their next match against St. Gallen The following season saw Basel improve their league position to third in the group, though it was distant to division leaders Young Boys and FC Aarau. Basel were again eliminated in the quarterfinals of the Anglo Cup in a lopsided loss to rivals Young Boys.

Basel began the 1911–12 season poorly, going winless in their first five games. They only won their sixth game due to a retrospective forfeit; opponents Young Boys used an ineligible player in a match Basel would have otherwise lost 4–1. They played a mixed run of form for the rest of the season, but had the highlight of defeating division leaders Étoile-Sporting on the back of a hat-trick from team captain Emil Hasler. Basel finished fifth in the league and did not participate in the Anglo Cup. The club's membership continued to grow, reaching 300 members prior to the club's 1912 annual general meeting. Basel's league season again began poorly, going winless in the first four rounds, but improved across the season and ended the campaign on a four-game unbeaten streak and finishing in fourth position. With two games to go, club chairman Karl Ibach signed Basel's first full-time manager in Percy Humphreys; until this point, the team captain had acted as player-manager. While Humphreys arrived too late to substantially affect league position, he was present for the entirety of the Anglo Cup. In the first round, Basel handily defeated Solothurn 5–0, which forced a game against St. Gallen who had knocked Basel out of the cup two years prior. Basel won the game 4–1 with Emil Schreyer scoring three times. FC Zürich forfeited their quarterfinal with Basel which set up a quarterfinal between Basel and Winterthur that won 3–0. In the final, Basel's opponent was second-level outfit Weissenbühl Bern who were easily defeated in a 5–0 rout, giving Basel their first piece of silverware. The Anglo Cup was not played the following year and would be discontinued due to World War I.

Fresh off the first silverware in club history, the Percy Humphreys-led Basel squad began the next season strongly with an 11–4 victory of La Chaux-de-Fonds. They continued their excellent form, winning seven of their first eight games, but faltered in key games and were unable to keep up with Young Boys as Basel finished in second. Basel had their largest competitive win in their history in the final game of the season, defeated La Chaux-de-Fonds again, this time in a 10–1 routing.

Due to the outbreak of World War I, manager Percy Humphreys had to return to England and the league was greatly reduced. Basel won two of their six league games and finished third in the four-team Central A division. In 1915, Basel founded their youth department and had over 50 youth players join; among them future first-team players Karl Bielser, Walter Dietrich, Max Galler, Theodor Schär and Ernst Zorzotti. The neutral Switzerland was stable enough to return to the pre-war league format and Basel once again played in an eight-team group. Basel had a poor year, losing nine of their fourteen games, but were saved from last place by an ailing Nordstern who took just four points from the season.

Basel began the 1916–17 season well, going undefeated for six games after an opening round loss. Basel travelled to Spain for friendly matches over Christmas and notably defeated Barcelona on the tour. In a crucial game against league leaders Young Boys, Basel were unable to compete and lost 6–1. Basel finished the season in second place, three point behind Young Boys. A similar story occurred the following season, as Basel again played well but finished narrowly in second place after Young Boys.

== Friendly-heavy era, beginning of Swiss Cup (1918–1931) ==
World War I was still being fought in the first half of the 1918–19 season. Basel finished fifth in the league's Central division. Team captain Otto Kuhn was Basel's leading scorer. Basel played a total of 44 matches in the 1919–20 season, fourteen more than the previous campaign. These games included friendlies against several international opponents, including Genoa, Karlsruher FV, Union Saint-Gilloise and Ferencváros. Based placed second in their group with 18 points from 14 league games. Walter Dietrich was appointed team captain in 1920. Despite high-profile friendlies against Strasbourg, Hannover 96 and Juventus, the 1920–21 season was greatly unsuccessful as they finished second-last.

Basel reduced their schedule down to 28 matches for the 1921–22 season. Basel finished third in their division as well as debuting in the Och Cup, which had been created the season prior. Basel lost in the first round to FC Olten while local rivals Concordia Basel won the trophy. Basel appointed former German international Max Breunig as manager at the beginning of the 1922–23 season. Basel finished in fourth place, though the season was overshadowed by an incident when the team hosted BSC Young Boys. While the historical record is unclear, the incident surrounded a serious disagreement between a Basel trainer and players of both teams on the field. After an inquiry, the league fined Basel and two Young Boys players, while banning the match referee for life, the Basel trainer for three years and Basel player Gustav Putzendopler for six months.

Karl Ibach remained as club chairman for the 1923–24 season, the first time the club had retained a chairman in six seasons. Basel started the season badly, losing four of the first five games; despite a surge in form, their poor play early in the season limited them to third, well behind Young Boys and Nordstern. The club lacked any particular attacking star: Otto Kuhn was the team's leading scorer with just four goals. Max Breunig left the club at the end of the season; team captain Gustav Putzendopler took over managerial responsibilities. Basel went unbeated in ten of their first eleven games in the 1924–25 season, but defeats late in the season cost them dearly as they finished in fourth position. The team's attacking issues continued but had a consistent scorer in Emil Breh, though he departed the club after the season.

Karl Bielser replaced Putzendopler as player-manager in 1925. Notable among the team's friendlies was hosting three-time consecutive English champions Huddersfield visited; despite losing badly, the game attracted 3,500 supporters. After a shock loss in their opening game to newly-promoted Solothurn, went unbeated for twelve games, winning six. Basel ended the season in second position, nine points adrift of division champions Young Boys, who continued to the finals. Leading scorer Arnold Hürzeler left the team after the season, though the team had a legitimate second option in Bielser, who scored seven goals across the season. The Och Cup had been replaced by the Swiss Cup prior to the season. Basel handily defeated FC Horgen in their first cup match, winning 8–1 as Arnold Hürzeler scored six times. They were eliminated in the next round despite drawing with Aarau; a coin toss was used as the tiebreaker and eliminated Basel. Very little changed at the club for the 1926–27 season, with Basel finishing fourth in the league and being eliminated early in the cup to Old Boys. Basel had another reasonable campaign in 1927–28 as they finished third in the division, though they were again unable to make an impact in the cup as they lost in the first round. A mid-season change occurred when Peter Riesterer took over as player-manager.

For the 1928–29 season, the club appointed Gyula Kertész as manager, only the third standalone manager in the club's history. The decision to employ a professional was necessitated by the continued success of local rivals Nordstern, who had qualified for the finals three times in the last five years. Basel began the year strongly, leading the division after winning eight of their first eleven games. However, the team slumped in their final five games, taking just three points and finishing the season in second place behind Young Boys. The squad lost in the second round of the cup to Concordia Basel. The team had a true strike force throughout the campaign, with Karl Bielser leading with fifteen goals, followed by Alfred Schlecht and Alfred Enderlin with fourteen and nine goals respectively.

Former captain Otto Kuhn became Basel's chairman in 1929. Basel started hot, winning their first five fixtures. Though their momentum slowed somewhat, winning five of the last eleven games, Basel broke through to win the group, two points ahead of runners-up Young Boys. However, Basel were uncompetitive in the final group, losing three of their four matches and finishing last. The team progressed further in the cup in this season, but eventually fell in the third round to FC Locarno. Kertész departed for Hamburger SV in 1930, with former Basel captain Gustav Putzendopler replacing him. Again, Basel began the season strongly but slowed over time. They eventually finished second and were required to participate in a play-off match against Nordstern to see who would join group champions Young Boys in the final group. Though they won the play-off, the Central teams were again uncompetitive in the final group, with Basel finishing 5th and Young Boys last. In the cup, Basel again lost to Locarno. Leopold Kielholz was the team's top scorer with 19 goals.

== League restructuring, relegation (1931–1939) ==
The structure of Swiss football changed ahead of the 1931–32 season, moving from three groups of eleven clubs to two groups of nine. Basel signed their first foreign professional player in Austrian international Otto Haftl prior to the season. In this more competitive format, Basel struggled initially and lost their first five games. Basel sacked manager Gustav Putzendopler and installed Haftl as player-manager, in addition to widespread squad changes. The team's fortunes changed greatly in the second half of the season, finishing with six victories in their last seven games. This resurgence put them four points above the relegation zone. Basel experienced their best cup run yet in this season, defeating SC Veltheim, Lugano, SC Brühl and La Chaux-de-Fonds to reach the semi-finals; however, they drew eventual cup champions Grasshopper Club and lost in an uncompetitive 8–1 fixture.

The club appointed Karl Kurz of FC Grenchen as manager in 1932, with Haftl remaining at Basel as a player. Basel played a competitive league season, finishing second behind Grasshopper Club. This allowed them to play Servette for the right to play for the championship, but Basel were defeated 4–3 in spite of a hat-trick from Otto Haftl. In the middle of the season, the Challenge National was held; a one-off round-robin competition between Nationalliga teams with the winners continuing to a final. Basel finished fifth in their group. In the Swiss Cup, Basel notched two easy wins against Concordia Basel and Blue Stars Zürich before drawing AC Bellinzona in the third round. Basel won the tight contest 3–2. After two high-scoring wins - 4–2 over Lugano and 5–3 over Lausanne-Sport - Basel advanced to the final against Grasshopper Club. They defeated the reigning cup champions 4–3 with Otto Haftl scoring twice. This was their first Swiss Cup victory and first trophy since 1913, when they won the Anglo Cup.

The league was again reformed prior to the 1933–34 season, abolishing the groups and moving to a league with sixteen teams. Basel began the new season well, winning six of their first nine games. However, manager Kurz fell ill with leukaemia and died aged 35 on the 26th of November. Kurz's countryman and fellow Basel coach Josef Haist took over as manager, though the team was severely affected and lost several matches in the weeks that followed. Basel finished fifth position in the table and were also unable to defend their cup victory, losing to Locarno for the third time in the competition. Richard Kohn was hired as manager before the beginning of the next season. Basel started the season well, winning nine of their first eleven games, but again finished ninth as they won only three of their final fifteen games. Basel advanced handily in the cup after playing their first three matches against teams from lower leagues, then beating Lugano in the quarterfinals. Their run ended against Nordstern in a 3–2 semifinal loss.

Kohn was hired by Feyenoord after the season; Basel appointed Alwin Riemke from double winners Lausanne-Sport. Basel had a mediocre season in 1935–36, finishing tenth in the league and being knocked out of the cup early by Luzern. This led to the appointment of new manager Heinz Körner, though he left Basel mid-season. Fernand Jaccard was made player-manager after Körner's departure. Basel played poorly for most of the season and were in last place for most of the year, but late wins allowed them to leadfrog floundering St. Gallen and draw even on points with La Chaux-de-Fonds, forcing a relegation play-off that Basel won, preventing their relegation. They had no success in the cup, losing in the first round.

Though the initial Nationalliga had sixteen teams, it had reduced this number year-by-year. By the 1937–38 season, only twelve teams contested the title. Basel improved upon their previous season handily with twelve victories and finished in fourth position, only three points off the title. Young forward Numa Monnard had transferred to Basel at the beginning of the season and scored 20 goals in 21 games, leading the Nationalliga. Basel were defeated by Grasshopper Club in the third round of the cup. The following season was disastrous for Basel. The club had been having financial difficulties for some time, which came to a head when Monnard returned to his former club Cantonal Neuchatel. The loss of their star forward ruined the team's consistency; they lost in the second round of the cup to lower-tier side Brühl St. Gallen and though Basel defeated the league's top two clubs, Grasshopper Club and Grenchen, they recorded just three other wins in the league. Basel finished in last place and were relegated for the first time in the club history.

== See also ==
- FC Basel
- List of FC Basel players
- List of FC Basel seasons
- Football in Switzerland

== Sources ==
- Die ersten 125 Jahre / 2018. Publisher: Josef Zindel im Friedrich Reinhardt Verlag, Basel. ISBN 978-3-7245-2305-5
- FC Basel Archiv / Verein "Basler Fussballarchiv"
