= Geldner =

Geldner is a surname. Notable people with the surname Geldner include:

- Georges Geldner (1872–unknown), Swiss football player
- Karl Friedrich Geldner (1852–1929), German linguist
- Karl Geldner (1927–2017), German politician
- Max Geldner (1875–1958), Swiss football player
- Niko Geldner (born 1972), German-Swiss biologist
- Roland Geldner (1870–1905), Swiss businessman
