= Georges Geldner =

Swiss footballer (born 1872)

Personal information
- Full name: Georg Wilhelm 'Georges' Geldner
- Date of birth: 7 July 1872
- Place of birth: Switzerland
- Date of death: unknown

Senior career*
Years	Team	Apps	(Gls)
1893–1894	FC Basel	(Note: League: up until 1898 there was no league football in Switzerland.)	
- * Club domestic league appearances and goals

Georg Wilhelm 'Georges' Geldner (born 7 July 1872) was a Swiss footballer who played for FC Basel in the 1890s.

== Football career ==
During a visit to England, his brothers Roland Geldner and Max Geldner they had seen the new football game. They placed an advert in the local newspaper to arrange a meeting about founding the Football Club Basel. Max attended the founders meeting and joined the team that evening. Roland was appointed as the club's first president. Georges joined the team a few days later.

Geldner trained with the team and eleven days after the club was founded the first game took place. Not much has been passed down from the first game that the FCB played on 26 November 1893. The club members met at the Landhof and played a game among themselves. It is considered as the first, but unofficial, game of FC Basel. The names of the players of both teams were recorded at that time, which can also be read in the annals of FC Basel, and the result was also passed on for posterity, Team 1: with the brothers and Georges, Roland and Max Geldner, Ferdinand Isler, Max Born, Josy Ebinger and Fritz Schäublin, beat Team 2: with John Tollmann, Adolf Hintermann, Wilhelm Glaser, Richard Strub, Mario Arbini, Emil Abderhalden, Lewis Gough and Jean Grieder by seven goals to two.

The first football match that the club held was in the Landhof on 10 December against the football team of the club RTV/Realschüler-Turnverein, a secondary school student gymnastics club. Geldner and both his brothers also played in this match, which the FCB won two goals to nil.

Teammate Charles Volderauer, as businessman, had good connections and used them from the very beginning. As early as June 1894, Volderauer organised the journey to visit Strassburger FV. Geldner travelled with the team by train to Strasbourg and played their first match against a foreign team, which ended with a 0–8 defeat.

Georges Geldner stayed with the team only this one season and during this time he played in both these games for Basel without scoring a goal.

== Notes ==
=== Sources ===
- Rotblau: Jahrbuch Saison 2017/2018. Publisher: FC Basel Marketing AG. ISBN 978-3-7245-2189-1
- Die ersten 125 Jahre. Publisher: Josef Zindel im Friedrich Reinhardt Verlag, Basel. ISBN 978-3-7245-2305-5
- Verein "Basler Fussballarchiv" Homepage
