= Erwin Schricker =

German footballer (1878-1914)

Personal information
- Full name: Erich Erwin Schricker
- Date of birth: 22 August 1878
- Place of birth: Strasbourg, Germany
- Date of death: 20 August 1914 (aged 35)
- Position: Defender

Youth career
- Straßburger FV

Senior career*
Years	Team	Apps	(Gls)
1894–1895	Karlsruher FV		
1895–1896	FC Basel	(Note: League: up until 1898 there was no league football in Switzerland.)	
1896–1903	Straßburger FV		
1903–1906	Karlsruher FV		
- * Club domestic league appearances and goals

Erich Erwin Schricker, called "Winnie", (22 August 1878 – 20 October 1914) was a German footballer who played as defender in the 1890s and early 1900s.

== Football career ==
Erwin Schricker was son of a privy councilor in Strasbourg, which at that time belonged to the German Empire. He came from a middle-class background and played his youth football together with his elder brother Ivo Schricker with local team Straßburger FV. During the summer of 1894 both brothers moved as a high school students to Karlsruhe. Here they joined and played for Karlsruher FV, where they met Walter Bensemann, the great pioneer of German and European football.

During Basel's 1895–96 season both brothers played two games for FC Basel. The first game they played was the home game on 1 December 1895 as Basel played a 2–2 draw with FC Excelsior Zürich. Joan Gamper was teammate in that game. The second game they played with Basel was on 8 March 1896 as Basel were defeated 1–3 by Grasshopper Club. Both Schricker's played only these two games for Basel, without scoring a goal. (Note: Scorers: many pre-First World War game sheets no longer exist or are incomplete and so, many line ups and most goal scorers in this period remain unknown.)

Following their time with Basel both returned to their club of origin Straßburger FV and later both again moved back to Karlsruher FV. Erwin Schricker was killed in action during World War One. Ivo Schricker became football fonctionnaire and later was the third General Secretary of FIFA (1932–1951).

== Notes ==
=== Sources ===
- Rotblau: Jahrbuch Saison 2017/2018. Publisher: FC Basel Marketing AG. ISBN 978-3-7245-2189-1
- Die ersten 125 Jahre. Publisher: Josef Zindel im Friedrich Reinhardt Verlag, Basel. ISBN 978-3-7245-2305-5
- Verein "Basler Fussballarchiv" Homepage
