= F. Moormann =

Swiss footballer

Personal information
- Full name: F. Moormann
- Date of birth: unknown
- Place of birth: Switzerland
- Position: Striker

Senior career*
Years	Team	Apps	(Gls)
1894–1895	FC Basel	(Note: League: up until 1898 there was no league football in Switzerland.)	
- * Club domestic league appearances and goals

F. Moormann (date of birth unknown) was a Swiss footballer who played for FC Basel as striker in the 1890s.

== Football career ==
FC Basel was founded on 15 November 1893 and Moormann joined the club about a year later during their 1894–95 season. He played his first game for the club in the away game on 7 April 1895 and scored his first goal for the team in the same game. It was the equaliser as Basel played a 1–1 draw with FC Excelsior Zürich.

The last game of that season was on 19 May and this was the team's first game played against newly formed local club FC Old Boys Basel. Moormann scored a hat-trick in this game as Basel won by six goals to nil. Moormann played only this one season for the club and these were his only two team appearances.

== Notes ==
=== Sources ===
- Rotblau: Jahrbuch Saison 2017/2018. Publisher: FC Basel Marketing AG. ISBN 978-3-7245-2189-1
- Die ersten 125 Jahre. Publisher: Josef Zindel im Friedrich Reinhardt Verlag, Basel. ISBN 978-3-7245-2305-5
- Verein "Basler Fussballarchiv" Homepage

(NB: Despite all efforts, the editors of these books and the authors in "Basler Fussballarchiv" have failed to be able to identify all the players, their date and place of birth or date and place of death, who played in the games during the early years of FC Basel)
