= Ivo Schricker =

German footballer (1877–1962)

Ivo Wolfgang Eduard Schricker

3rd General Secretary of FIFA
- In office 1932–1951
- Preceded by: Carl Anton Wilhelm Hirschman
- Succeeded by: Kurt Gassmann

Personal details
- Born: Ivo Wolfgang Eduard Schricker; 18 March 1877 Strasbourg, German Empire
- Died: 10 January 1962 (aged 84) Zürich, Switzerland
- Occupation: Footballer
Association football career
- Position: Defender
Youth career
- 1892–1893: Straßburger FV
Senior career*
| Years | Team | Apps | (Gls) |
| 1893–1894 | Straßburger FV | | |
| 1894–1895 | Karlsruher Kickers | | |
| 1895–1896 | FC Basel | (Note: League: up until 1898 there was no league football in Switzerland.) | |
- Akademischer SC
- Karlsruher FV
- * Club domestic league appearances and goals

Ivo Wolfgang Eduard Schricker (18 March 1877 – 10 January 1962) was a German footballer and the third General Secretary of the FIFA, serving from 1932 to 1951 upon his resignation.

== Biography ==
Ivo Schricker was son of a privy councilor in Strasbourg, which at that time belonged to the German Empire. He came from a middle-class background and played his youth football together with his younger brother Erwin with local team Straßburger FV. During the summer of 1894 both brothers moved as a high school students to Karlsruhe. Here they joined and played for Karlsruher FV, where they met Walter Bensemann, a pioneer of German and European football.

During Basel's 1895–96 season both brothers played two games for FC Basel. The first game they played was the home game on 1 December 1895 as Basel played a 2–2 draw with FC Excelsior Zürich. Joan Gamper was team mate in that game. The second game they played with Basel was on 8 March 1896 as Basel were defeated 3–1 by Grasshoppers. Both Schricker's played only these two games for Basel, without scoring a goal. (Note: Scorers: many pre-First World War game sheets no longer exist or are incomplete and so, many line ups and most goal scorers in this period remain unknown.)

Following their time with Basel both returned to their club of origin Straßburger FV and later both again moved to Karlsruher Kickers. Erwin Schricker (22 August 1878 – 20 October 1914) was killed in action during World War One.

While studying in Berlin Ivo Schricker played for Akademischer SC 1893 Berlin. With Karlsruher FV he became South German champion several times. In 1899 he was among the best players in the first, still unofficial, game against a team from England, and in September 1901, he also played in London.

Schricker's home town, Strasbourg in Alsace, was after World War I annexed to France again. After retirement as player, Schricker served from 1923 to 1925 as president of the South German association (Süddeutscher Fußball-Verband).

He moved to Zürich in Switzerland, a central and conveniently located place that fitted FIFA needs well when a permanent office was set up. Ivo Schricker became the organisation's first employee, and was appointed Permanent Secretary in 1931, working in a 30 square metre apartment at Bahnhofstrasse 77 that remained the home of football's governing body until 1954. From 1948 onwards, he was supported by secretary Marta Kurmann.

== Notes ==
=== References ===
- Henry Wahlig: Dr. Ivo Schricker. Ein Deutscher in Diensten des Weltfußballs, in: Lorenz Peiffer / Dietrich Schulze-Marmeling (Hg.): Hakenkreuz und rundes Leder. Fußball im Nationalsozialismus, S. 197 – 206, Göttingen 2008

=== Sources ===
- Rotblau: Jahrbuch Saison 2017/2018. Publisher: FC Basel Marketing AG. ISBN 978-3-7245-2189-1
- Die ersten 125 Jahre. Publisher: Josef Zindel im Friedrich Reinhardt Verlag, Basel. ISBN 978-3-7245-2305-5
- Verein "Basler Fussballarchiv" Homepage
