= Jean Grieder =

Wiss businessman (1874–1941)

Personal information
- Date of birth: 28 March 1874
- Date of death: 1941
- Position: Midfielder

Senior career*
Years	Team	Apps	(Gls)
1893–1894	FC Basel	(Note: League: up until 1898 there was no league football in Switzerland.)	
- * Club domestic league appearances and goals

Jean Grieder (28 March 1874 – 1941) was a Swiss businessman, an asset and liability manager. He held high honorary positions in his hometown and was founder member of FC Basel.

== Football career ==
Grieder was member of the Basel rowing club and during a visit to England he had seen the new football game. After a newspaper advert, there was a meeting on 15 November 1893 and the Fussball Club Basel was founded. Grieder attended the founders meeting and joined the team that evening. At the club’s second meeting Roland Geldner was elected as the club's first chairman and Grieder as the club's secretary .

Grieder joined the team’s trainings. Team mate Charles Volderauer, as businessman, had good connections and used them from the very beginning. As early as June 1894, he organised the journey to visit Strassburger FV. Grieder was with the group that travelled and played in the match, which ended with a 0–8 defeat.

He stayed with the club as active footballed just one year and during this time Grieder played only that one game for Basel. Grieder held high honorary positions in his hometown, including many functions with the rowing club.
