= Hans Koch (footballer) =

Swiss footballer

Personal information
- Full name: Hans Koch
- Date of birth: unknown
- Place of birth: Switzerland
- Positions: Midfielder; striker

Senior career*
Years	Team	Apps	(Gls)
1895–1897	FC Basel	(Note: League: up until 1898 there was no league football in Switzerland.)	
- * Club domestic league appearances and goals

Hans Koch (date of birth unknown) was a Swiss footballer who played in the 1890s as striker and as midfielder.

== Football career ==
FC Basel was founded on 15 November 1893 and Koch joined the club about two years later, during their 1895–96 season. Koch played his first game for the club in the home game on 12 April 1896 as Basel won 3–0 against FC Excelsior Zürich. He also played in the return match which took place two weeks later.

In the following season Koch played in six of the team's seven matches. He stayed with the club for these two seasons and during his time with them, Koch played eight games for Basel without scoring a goal. (Note: Scorers: many pre-First World War game sheets no longer exist or are incomplete and so, many line ups and most goal scorers in this period remain unknown.)

== Notes ==
=== Sources ===
- Rotblau: Jahrbuch Saison 2017/2018. Publisher: FC Basel Marketing AG. ISBN 978-3-7245-2189-1
- Die ersten 125 Jahre. Publisher: Josef Zindel im Friedrich Reinhardt Verlag, Basel. ISBN 978-3-7245-2305-5
- Verein "Basler Fussballarchiv" Homepage

(NB: Despite all efforts, the editors of these books and the authors in "Basler Fussballarchiv" have failed to be able to identify all the players, their date and place of birth or date and place of death, who played in the games during the early years of FC Basel)
