= Hans Müry =

Swiss footballer

Personal information
- Full name: Hans Müry
- Date of birth: unknown
- Place of birth: Switzerland

Senior career*
| Years | Team | Apps | (Gls) |
| 1894–1895 | FC Basel | (Note: League: up until 1898 there was no league football in Switzerland.) | |
- * Club domestic league appearances and goals

Hans Müry (date of birth unknown) was a Swiss footballer who played for FC Basel in the 1890s.

== Football career ==
FC Basel was founded on 15 November 1893 and Müry joined the club about a year later during their 1894–95 season.

On 21 October 1894 Basel played their first game in Zürich, the city on the Limmat, against Grasshopper Club Zürich. The match was very positively commentated by GC in the local newspaper: It really deserves credit for the fact that they dare to travel so far, despite their short existence. Our colleagues in Basel have the same principles as we do. They find that one can only learn the game properly through playing many matches and possibly suffering defeats. Therefore, we pay the highest appreciation to the young club, that has to make significant sacrifices in order to achieve this aim. Despite all expressions of respect, the game on the Zurich swamp-like underground ended with a 0–4 defeat for Basel. After the heated fight between the two teams, the guests were entertained and then accompanied by the hosts to an evening drink and finally to the train station. Müry played his first game for the club on this day.

Because of the positive experience, the FCB players looked forward to the return match against GC two weeks later. Over a dozen members gathered at the train station in Basel to accompany the guests through the city and to have a "morning pint" before the match. The spectators were shown an attractive game, which FCB only lost 0–3, they had improved compared to the first leg. It was noteworthy that Basel put the ball in the opponents’ goal twice before half time, but the both goals fell from an offside position. Müry played in the return match as well. As in Zürich two weeks earlier, in Basel too, after the game they treated themselves to a dinner and the opponents were also accompanied back to the train station.

He stayed with the team only this one season and during this time Müry played four games for Basel without scoring a goal.

== Notes ==
=== Sources ===
- Rotblau: Jahrbuch Saison 2017/2018. Publisher: FC Basel Marketing AG. ISBN 978-3-7245-2189-1
- Die ersten 125 Jahre. Publisher: Josef Zindel im Friedrich Reinhardt Verlag, Basel. ISBN 978-3-7245-2305-5
- Verein "Basler Fussballarchiv" Homepage

(NB: Despite all efforts, the editors of these books and the authors in "Basler Fussballarchiv" have failed to be able to identify all the players, their date and place of birth or date and place of death, who played in the games during the early years of FC Basel)
