= F. H. de Boer =

Dutch footballer

Personal information
- Full name: F. H. de Boer
- Date of birth: unknown
- Date of death: unknown
- Positions: Midfielder; striker

Senior career*
Years	Team	Apps	(Gls)
1894–1896	FC Basel	(Note: League: up until 1898 there was no league football in Switzerland.)	
- * Club domestic league appearances and goals

F. H. de Boer (date of birth unknown) was a Dutch footballer who played for FC Basel. He played mainly in the position as striker, but also as midfielder.

== Football career ==
FC Basel was founded on 15 November 1893 and de Boer joined the club a few months later during their 1893–94 season. He played his first game for the club in the home game on 14 October 1894 as Basel played a goalless draw with RTV/Realschüler-Turnverein, a secondary school student gymnastics club.

He played active football with the club for two seasons and during this time de Boer played at least six games for Basel without scoring a goal. (Note: Scorers: many pre-First World War game sheets no longer exist or are incomplete and so, many line ups and most goal scorers in this period remain unknown.)

After his active football de Boer remained as club member and acted as referee.

== Notes ==
=== Sources ===
- Rotblau: Jahrbuch Saison 2017/2018. Publisher: FC Basel Marketing AG. ISBN 978-3-7245-2189-1
- Die ersten 125 Jahre. Publisher: Josef Zindel im Friedrich Reinhardt Verlag, Basel. ISBN 978-3-7245-2305-5
- Verein "Basler Fussballarchiv" Homepage

(NB: Despite all efforts, the editors of these books and the authors in "Basler Fussballarchiv" have failed to be able to identify all the players, their date and place of birth or date and place of death, who played in the games during the early years of FC Basel)
