= Christian Heyd =

Swiss footballer (born 1878)

Personal information
- Full name: Christian Heyd
- Date of birth: 20 December 1878
- Place of birth: Switzerland
- Date of death: unknown
- Position: Defender

Senior career*
Years	Team	Apps	(Gls)
1894–1896	FC Basel	(Note: League: up until 1898 there was no league football in Switzerland.)	
- * Club domestic league appearances and goals

Christian Heyd (born 20 December 1878) was a Swiss footballer who played for FC Basel in the 1890s as defender.

== Football career ==
FC Basel was founded on 15 November 1893 and Heyd joined the club about a year later, during their 1894–95 season. He played his first game for the club in the away game on 7 April 1895 as Basel played a 1–1 draw with FC Excelsior Zürich.

Heyd stayed with the team for two seasons, his last game for them was a home game against the same club. On 12 April 1896 Basel won 3–0 against Excelsior Zürich. During his time with the club Heyd played nine games for Basel without scoring a goal. (Note: Scorers: many pre-First World War game sheets no longer exist or are incomplete and so, many line ups and most goal scorers in this period remain unknown.)

== Notes ==
=== Sources ===
- Rotblau: Jahrbuch Saison 2017/2018. Publisher: FC Basel Marketing AG. ISBN 978-3-7245-2189-1
- Die ersten 125 Jahre. Publisher: Josef Zindel im Friedrich Reinhardt Verlag, Basel. ISBN 978-3-7245-2305-5
- Verein "Basler Fussballarchiv" Homepage

(NB: Despite all efforts, the editors of these books and the authors in "Basler Fussballarchiv" have failed to be able to identify all the players, their date and place of birth or date and place of death, who played in the games during the early years of FC Basel)
