= History of FC Basel (2000–present) =

History FC Basel

Fussball Club Basel 1893 is a Swiss football club with a history dating back to its founding on 15 November 1893. The club has competed at the highest level of football in Switzerland for most of its existence and currently plays in the Swiss Super League.

Due to the length of its history, the history of FC Basel has been divided into five sections. This fifth section covers the financial investments made in the club during this period, the move to the new stadium, St. Jakob-Park, the return of success, and developments up to the present day. For details on other periods of the club's history, see the following articles:

- History of FC Basel (1893–1939)
- History of FC Basel (1939–1965)
- History of FC Basel (1965–2000)

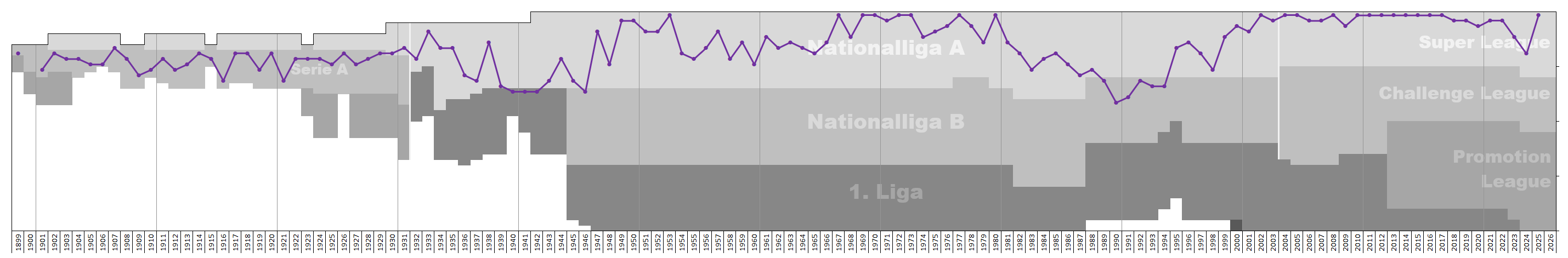
Chart of FC Basel table positions in the Swiss football league system

== The Gross era ==
=== 108th season, St. Jakob-Park ===
The 2000–01 season was FC Basel's 108th since the club's foundation. René C. Jäggi served as chairman for the fifth consecutive year, while Christian Gross was head coach for the second successive season. Basel played their home matches at the Stadion Schützenmatte until 15 March 2001, when they moved into the newly built St. Jakob-Park.

Gross continued building his squad, making several signings before the start of the season. Goalkeeper Miroslav König, midfielders André Muff and Hakan Yakin joined from Grasshopper Club Zürich. Strikers Hervé Tum from Sion and Jean-Michel Tchouga from Yverdon-Sport were added to strengthen the attack. Ivan Ergić was signed from Juventus, while Carlos Varela arrived on loan from Servette. Departures included Pascal Zuberbühler, who joined Bayer Leverkusen on a one-year loan, Marco Tschopp, who was loaned to Neuchâtel Xamax, and Edmond N'Tiamoah, who spent six months on loan at SR Delémont.

The league season began with a qualification round involving twelve teams. The top eight advanced to the Championship Playoff Round. Basel aimed to finish the qualification round in the top four and secure a place in European competition. After an inconsistent start with three wins and three defeats, the team became more stable, losing only once in the next 12 matches. They were able to host their Championship Playoff Round matches at St. Jakob-Park, which opened on 15 March 2001. The stadium was sold out three times, against Lausanne-Sport, St. Gallen and Grasshopper Club Zürich, each with 33,433 spectators. In the Championship Round, Basel lost only twice but drew eight matches, with goal scoring proving difficult. They finished fourth in the league, qualifying for the 2001 UEFA Intertoto Cup.

In the Swiss Cup, Basel entered at the Round of 32 on 18 February 2001, defeating Étoile Carouge after a penalty shoot-out. In the Round of 16 they beat Bellinzona, before being eliminated in the quarter-finals by Lausanne-Sport, again after a penalty shoot-out.

In Europe, Basel competed in the 2000–01 UEFA Cup. In the qualifying round they defeated Folgore 12–1 on aggregate. In the first round they beat Brann 7–6 on aggregate, but in the second round they were eliminated by Feyenoord, who won both legs. This ended Basel's European campaign before the winter break.

=== 109th season ===
René C. Jäggi continued as chairman for the sixth consecutive season, while Christian Gross remained head coach for the third successive year. Youth players Philipp Degen and Marco Streller were promoted from the reserve team and signed professional contracts. Goalkeeper Pascal Zuberbühler returned from a one-year loan at Bayer Leverkusen. Notable signings included Scott Chipperfield from Wollongong Wolves and Christian Eduardo Giménez from Lugano.

The 2001–02 Nationalliga A season began on 4 July 2001 with twelve teams competing in the qualification round. Basel started poorly, suffering an 8–1 defeat away to FC Sion in the opening match. On 11 July, Streller made his league debut at St. Jakob-Park in a 3–1 win against Servette, but he scored an own goal in the final minute while attempting to clear a corner. Giménez made his debut on 18 July in a 3–3 draw with St. Gallen, and scored his first goal for the club in a 3–1 win over Young Boys on 11 August. He went on to finish the season as the Swiss league’s top scorer.

After five matches, Basel had registered only one win and one draw alongside three defeats. Their form improved significantly thereafter, and despite losing both fixtures against defending champions Grasshopper Club Zürich, Basel ended the qualification round at the top of the table. In the Championship Round they recorded ten wins and just one defeat in the first eleven matches, pulling clear of their rivals to secure the league title with three games remaining. This was Basel’s first championship in 22 years.

In the Swiss Cup, Basel aimed to win the competition, particularly as the final was scheduled to be played at St. Jakob-Park. In the quarter-finals they defeated Zürich 4–1. The semi-final against Young Boys ended in a draw after extra time, but Basel advanced after winning the penalty shoot-out. In the final they defeated Grasshopper Club Zürich after extra time, with Murat Yakin scoring the decisive penalty following a handball by Boris Smiljanić.

=== 110th season, Champions League ===
René C. Jäggi, who had been chairman for six seasons, stepped down at the club's annual general meeting in October. Businessman Werner Edelmann was elected as his successor. Christian Gross continued as head coach for the fourth consecutive season. As holders of both the league and the cup, Basel's main objectives for 2002–03 were to defend their domestic titles and to progress as far as possible in the UEFA Champions League, with the minimum aim of reaching the group stage.

Key signings included Julio Hernán Rossi from Lugano, Antonio Esposito from Saint-Étienne, and Bernt Haas on loan from West Bromwich Albion. Veteran Massimo Ceccaroni retired after 25 years at the club, where he was regarded as a cult figure due to his loyalty and the fact that he never scored in the top flight of Swiss football.

The Swiss Football Association restructured the league for the season, reducing the top two tiers from 24 to 20 teams, with ten in each division. Basel began strongly, going undefeated in their first seven matches (five wins, two draws), before losing two in succession. They recovered to win nine and draw two of the next eleven games. However, a 2–1 home defeat to Grasshopper Club Zürich saw Basel finish the qualification stage in second place at the winter break. In the Championship Round, Basel won ten of their 14 games but could not overtake Grasshoppers, who secured the league title by a single point.

In the Swiss Cup, Basel entered in the Round of 32, defeating Yverdon-Sport. They were eliminated by Servette in the Round of 16. In the quarter-finals, Basel drew 3–3 away to Young Boys after conceding a two-goal lead, but advanced with an extra-time winner from Hakan Yakin. A 3–0 semi-final victory over Schaffhausen set up a final against Neuchâtel Xamax at St. Jakob-Park, which Basel won convincingly 6–0.

In Europe, Basel entered the Champions League in the second qualifying round, defeating Žilina of Slovakia 4–1 on aggregate. In the third qualifying round they faced Celtic, losing 3–1 away at Celtic Park but overturning the deficit with a 2–0 home victory to progress on away goals.

Drawn into Group B with Valencia, Liverpool, and Spartak Moscow, Basel opened with a 2–0 win against Spartak and a 1–1 draw away to Liverpool. A heavy 6–2 defeat at Valencia was followed by a 2–2 draw in the return fixture. Victories over Spartak and a 3–3 home draw with Liverpool on the final matchday secured second place in the group and qualification for the second group stage.

There, Basel were grouped with Manchester United, Juventus, and Deportivo de La Coruña. After defeats to Manchester United and Juventus, Basel revived their campaign with two wins against Deportivo. They then drew 1–1 away to Manchester United and beat Juventus 2–1 at home. Despite finishing level on points with Juventus, Basel were eliminated on tie-breaking criteria but exceeded expectations by reaching the last 16.

=== 111th season, tenth championship ===
Werner Edelmann was confirmed as chairman at the club's annual general meeting, while Christian Gross continued as head coach for the fifth successive season. Former youth player David Degen, who had begun his professional career with FC Aarau in 2000, returned to Basel. The club's most notable signing ahead of the 2003–04 campaign was Matías Emilio Delgado from Chacarita Juniors.

Although Grasshopper Club Zürich were the defending champions, Basel entered the season as favourites. As runners-up in the previous league season, Basel qualified for the first round of the UEFA Cup. The club set three clear targets: to win the league title, to defend the domestic cup, and to progress in Europe at least until the winter break.

The Swiss Football Association had modified the domestic league format, but Basel's main priority remained the championship. The season began on 16 July 2003 with a home match at St. Jakob-Park against Zürich, attended by 30,561 spectators. Their second fixture, away to Young Boys at the sold-out Stadion Neufeld in Bern, ended in a 3–2 win for Basel thanks to a late goal from Antonio Esposito. On 16 August, Christian Giménez scored a hat-trick in a 4–0 away win over Thun.

Basel started the campaign strongly, winning their first 13 matches before dropping their first points in a 2–2 draw away to Aarau. They led the league table from the opening round and maintained this position throughout the season. After the winter break, their form was less consistent, with their first defeat coming on matchday 24, a 1–0 loss away to Zürich at the Letzigrund. Nevertheless, Basel regained momentum and remained top of the table until the end of the season, securing their tenth league title.

As defending champions in the Swiss Cup, Basel aimed to retain the title. They won their opening two matches against lower-league opposition, FC Alle and Urania Genève Sport. However, in the third round they were eliminated following a 1–0 defeat away to Grasshopper Club Zürich at the Hardturm.

In Europe, Basel entered the UEFA Cup first round, where they were drawn against Malatyaspor. In the first leg, goals from captain Murat Yakin and substitute Hakan Yakin gave Basel a 2–0 away win. In the return leg at St. Jakob-Park, Malatyaspor won 2–0 to level the tie on aggregate. Marco Streller then scored a silver goal in extra time to send Basel through.

In the second round Basel faced Newcastle United. In the first leg at home, Mario Cantaluppi gave Basel an early lead, but goals from Laurent Robert, Scott Chipperfield, Titus Bramble, and Shola Ameobi left the visitors 3–2 winners. Newcastle also won the return leg, eliminating Basel 4–2 on aggregate.

=== 112th season, champions ===
Werner Edelmann was confirmed as chairman at the annual general meeting, while Christian Gross continued as head coach for the sixth successive season. As reigning champions, Basel entered the 2004–05 campaign as favourites to retain their title. They also began their European campaign in the third qualifying round of the UEFA Champions League. The club's most notable pre-season signing was Kléber from Hannover 96, and during the winter break they added Patrick Müller from Mallorca. Basel's primary domestic objective was to defend their championship.

The season began unevenly, with only two wins in the first four home matches. Despite this, Basel soon established themselves at the top of the table. In September they suffered consecutive away defeats but entered the winter break seven points clear of their nearest rivals. Over the course of the season, Basel went unbeaten at home, winning 13 and drawing four of their 17 league fixtures. They secured the championship with three matches remaining, finishing ten points ahead of second-placed Thun.

In the Swiss Cup, Basel entered in the first round and set the objective of winning the competition. They defeated local amateur side FC Oberdorf 4–0 and then overcame second-tier FC Meyrin 3–1. In the third round they faced Thun away. The match finished 1–1 after extra time, and Basel were eliminated 4–3 in the penalty shoot-out after Mile Sterjovski missed the decisive spot-kick. The cup final was eventually contested between Zürich and Luzern, with Zürich winning 3–1 on 16 May 2005.

In Europe, Basel entered the third qualifying round of the Champions League, where they were drawn against Internazionale. The first leg in Basel ended 1–1, but the return fixture in Milan resulted in a 4–1 defeat, giving Inter a 5–2 aggregate victory. Basel were therefore transferred to the 2004–05 UEFA Cup.

In the UEFA Cup, Basel defeated FC Terek Grozny 3–1 on aggregate in the first round, following a 1–1 away draw and a 2–0 home win. In the group stage, they were drawn in Group A with Feyenoord, FC Schalke 04, Ferencvárosi TC, and Heart of Midlothian. Feyenoord, Schalke, and Basel each finished with seven points, but Basel advanced to the Round of 32 on goal difference.

There, they were paired with Lille OSC. The first leg in Basel, played in snowy conditions, ended in a goalless draw, largely due to the performance of Lille goalkeeper Tony Sylva. In the return match in France, Lille won 2–0, eliminating Basel 2–0 on aggregate. While the club had hoped to progress further, reaching the knockout stage meant that their European target was considered met. CSKA Moscow went on to win the competition, defeating Sporting CP in the final.

=== 113th season, Basel hooligan incident ===
Basel's primary objective for the 2005–06 season was to win the Swiss Super League championship for the third consecutive year. Despite a 3–0 defeat against FC Thun in the second round, Basel led the table throughout the season until the final day. On 26 February 2006, the club broke their own record of 52 consecutive unbeaten home league matches at St. Jakob-Park, later extending the streak to 59. The run ended in the decisive final match, when Iulian Filipescu scored a late goal for Zürich, securing Zürich's first championship since 1980–81. The 2–1 defeat meant Basel lost the title on goal difference, missing the opportunity to claim a third successive league championship.

The dramatic loss of the title was followed by riots, known as the 2006 Basel hooligan incident, which led to disciplinary and legal consequences for the club and supporters.

In the Swiss Cup, Basel entered in the first round with the aim of winning the competition. They defeated lower-league side Solothurn 4–1 and then beat local club Old Boys 6–1 in the second round, with Mile Sterjovski scoring four goals. In the third round, however, despite early goals from Julio Hernán Rossi and Matías Delgado, Basel were eliminated after a 4–3 home defeat to Zürich.

As runners-up in the league, Basel entered the UEFA Champions League in the third qualifying round, where they were drawn against Werder Bremen and lost 4–2 on aggregate, moving into the UEFA Cup. In the first round they defeated Široki Brijeg of Bosnia and Herzegovina 6–0 on aggregate. Drawn into Group E alongside Strasbourg, Roma, Red Star, and Tromsø, Basel finished third with two wins and two defeats, qualifying for the knockout phase.

In the Round of 32, Basel defeated Monaco 2–1 on aggregate, and in the Round of 16 they eliminated Strasbourg 4–2 on aggregate. In the quarter-finals, Basel won the first leg 2–0 at home against Middlesbrough, but in the return leg at the Riverside Stadium, the English club overturned the deficit with a 4–1 victory, advancing 4–3 on aggregate. Middlesbrough went on to reach the final, where they lost 4–0 to Sevilla.

Despite elimination in the quarter-finals, Basel's European campaign was regarded as a success. Matías Emilio Delgado finished as the top scorer of the 2005–06 UEFA Cup.

=== 114th season, runners-up ===
After four seasons as chairman, Werner Edelmann stepped down and Gisela Oeri was elected as the club's first chairwoman at the AGM. Christian Gross continued as head coach for the eighth successive season. Ahead of the new campaign, Basel made several transfers. The most notable was the replacement of Swiss international goalkeeper Pascal Zuberbühler, who transferred to West Bromwich Albion, with Argentine international Franco Costanzo from Deportivo Alavés.

Following the last-minute loss of the 2005–06 league title after the 1–2 home defeat to FC Zürich on 13 May 2006, and the subsequent riots, the club faced consequences. In addition to a heavy fine, the first two home games of the 2006–07 season were played behind closed doors. Basel started poorly, losing five of their first ten league matches and falling ten points behind the leaders. After the winter break, however, they recovered strongly and finished the campaign as runners-up, just one point behind champions Zürich, despite winning three of the four direct encounters. Basel thus missed their league target.

The Swiss Cup campaign began on 26 August 2006, with a 6–1 win over local amateur side FC Liestal. In the second round, Basel defeated second-tier Lugano 4–0. The third-round tie on 12 November against second-tier FC Baulmes required extra time, during which Mile Sterjovski scored the decisive 3–2 goal. In the quarter-final on 14 March 2007, Basel defeated FC Aarau 1–0 with Sterjovski scoring in the first minute. In the semi-final on 26 April, Basel beat FC Wil 3–1 to reach the final. Basel won the Swiss Cup by defeating Luzern 1–0, with Daniel Majstorović converting a penalty in the 93rd minute. Four days earlier, Basel had missed out on the league title, but they secured the domestic cup on Whit Monday.

In European competition, Basel entered the UEFA Cup in the first qualifying round, defeating Tobol of Kazakhstan 3–1 on aggregate. In the second round they played Vaduz of Liechtenstein, progressing narrowly on the away goals rule after a 2–2 aggregate draw. They then faced Rabotnički of North Macedonia, winning 6–2 at St. Jakob-Park and 1–0 away to reach the group stage. Basel were drawn against Blackburn Rovers, Nancy, Feyenoord and Wisła Kraków. The group stage campaign began with a 1–1 home draw against Feyenoord, followed by a 3–0 away defeat to Blackburn. The next match, at home against Nancy, ended 2–2. In their final group game against Wisła Kraków, Basel needed a win to progress but were eliminated after a 3–1 defeat, despite taking an early lead through Mladen Petrić.

=== 115th season, champions ===
At the beginning of the 2007–08 season, Basel strengthened their squad by signing Swiss internationals Benjamin Huggel from Eintracht Frankfurt, Marco Streller from VfB Stuttgart, and David Degen on loan from Borussia Mönchengladbach. Carlitos joined from Benfica for an estimated €1.5 million (CHF 1.61 million). In addition, five players were promoted from the under-21 team.

Basel's main objective for the season was to win the league championship. The Swiss Super League began on 22 July with a 1–0 home victory against FC Zürich. In the fourth and sixth rounds, Basel suffered defeats, 1–5 against BSC Young Boys and 0–2 against Grasshopper Club, which pushed them down to fourth place in the table. It took two months before they returned to the top position, during which they won nine and drew two of eleven matches. Just before the winter break, Basel lost at home to Xamax and then again away to Young Boys in the first match after the restart. Despite this, they retained the lead for most of the season, slipping to second place only twice. In the last eight games, Basel recorded four wins and four draws, which was enough to secure the title. Basel won the league on 10 May 2008 at St. Jakob-Park with a 2–0 win over title rivals Young Boys, their first championship since 2005.

Basel also retained the Swiss Cup, defeating second-tier side AC Bellinzona 4–1 in the final at St. Jakob-Park on 6 April 2008. Eren Derdiyok opened the scoring in the first half, before Christian Pouga equalised for Bellinzona. Daniel Majstorović restored Basel's lead with a header, and Swiss internationals Streller and Huggel each added a goal to secure victory.

In European competition, Basel entered the UEFA Cup in the first qualifying round, defeating FK Sarajevo of Bosnia and Herzegovina 8–1 on aggregate. In the second round, they beat SV Mattersburg of Austria 6–1 on aggregate, including a 4–0 away win. Basel were then drawn into Group D, regarded as a "group of death", alongside Brann, Dinamo Zagreb, Hamburger SV, and Rennes. They opened with a 1–0 home win against Rennes through a Marco Streller header. A 0–0 away draw with Dinamo Zagreb followed, secured by goalkeeper Franco Costanzo. Basel then defeated Brann 1–0 at home before drawing 1–1 away to Hamburg. This was enough to progress to the Round of 32, where they faced Sporting CP. In the first leg in Lisbon, Basel lost 2–0 after first-choice goalkeeper Costanzo was injured. He remained unavailable for the return leg in Basel, which Sporting won 3–0, eliminating Basel 5–0 on aggregate.

The season was considered highly successful for Basel, as they won both the Swiss Super League and Swiss Cup while reaching the last 32 of the UEFA Cup.

=== 116th season, third place ===
Gisela Oeri continued as chairwoman of the club, while Christian Gross remained as first-team manager for his tenth season. As the defending champions, Basel's main objective was to retain the domestic league title.

Basel began the season on 18 July 2008 with a 2–1 away victory against Young Boys. FC Aarau had the strongest start with four wins and one draw, topping the table for the first five matchdays, before Basel moved into first place following a 4–1 away win against Zürich. Zurich later overtook Basel on goal difference, but Basel regained the lead with consistent results. The two sides drew 1–1 in their head-to-head meeting on matchday 15, keeping Basel in first place. However, a 2–0 defeat to Xamax and Zurich's win over FC Sion shifted the lead back to FCZ. Basel suffered a heavy 5–1 loss to bottom-placed Luzern in the last match of the year, leaving Zurich four points ahead at the winter break.

After the restart, Zurich drew 2–2 against Grasshopper Club, but Basel's loss to YB increased the gap to five points. On matchday 25, Basel briefly returned to the top after a 5–0 home win against FC Vaduz, but Zurich reclaimed first place in the following round. The lead continued to change hands until matchday 29, when Basel dropped points against AC Bellinzona and Zurich regained control. Despite Basel's 3–1 win over Zurich on matchday 33, Zurich secured the championship by winning their final matches, while Basel lost 4–1 to Grasshopper.

Basel finished the season in third place, their lowest position since 2001. On 27 May 2009, Gross' contract was terminated, effective after the final match, ending his ten-year tenure as Basel manager.

In the 2008–09 Swiss Cup, Basel's campaign began with a narrow 1–0 win over third-tier FC Schötz. They then defeated FC Bulle 4–1 and FC Thun 4–0 to reach the quarter-finals, where they beat FC Zürich 1–0 away at the Letzigrund. In the semi-final against Young Boys on 16 April 2009, the match ended goalless after extra time, and YB won the penalty shoot-out 3–2, with goalkeeper Marco Wölfli saving three spot-kicks. Basel's stated aim of retaining the Cup was not achieved, though reaching the semi-final was considered a respectable result.

In the Champions League, Basel entered in the second qualifying round against IFK Göteborg of Sweden. The tie ended 1–1 away before Basel won the return leg 4–2 at St. Jakob-Park. In the third qualifying round, Basel faced Vitória de Guimarães. After a goalless first leg, Basel won 2–1 at home, advancing to the group stage.

Drawn in Group C with Barcelona, Shakhtar Donetsk and Sporting CP, Basel finished bottom. They lost their opener 2–1 at home to Shakhtar, followed by a 2–0 away defeat to Sporting. Barcelona defeated them 5–0 in Basel, though FCB managed a 1–1 draw in the return leg. Heavy losses followed, 5–0 away to Shakhtar and 1–0 at home to Sporting, sealing their elimination.

== Eight consecutive titles ==
=== 117th season, Fink ===
German manager Thorsten Fink was appointed as Basel's new head coach on 9 June 2009. Several players were promoted from the under-21 squad, including Xherdan Shaqiri and Marco Aratore, while new signings included Alexander Frei from Borussia Dortmund.

In domestic competitions, Basel ultimately achieved a league and cup double. After a slow start, Basel were in ninth place after the eighth round. The team recovered, winning seven of the next eight matches, and produced their strongest form in the second half of the season, winning nine consecutive games and 16 of their final 18 matches. A 0–4 away defeat to Grasshoppers in the fifth-to-last round left Basel level on points with Young Boys heading into the final match.

On 16 May 2010, the decisive match was played at the Stade de Suisse in Bern in front of 31,120 spectators. Valentin Stocker scored to give Basel the lead, before a cross from Stocker found Scott Chipperfield, who headed home to secure a 2–0 victory. Basel won the championship.

Basel also competed in the 2009–10 Swiss Cup, entering in the first round. They defeated SC Cham, FC Le Mont-sur-Lausanne, and Zürich in the early rounds. In the quarter-finals, Basel beat Biel-Bienne, followed by a semi-final victory over SC Kriens. In the final, Basel defeated Lausanne-Sport 6–0, securing their tenth Swiss Cup title.

In European competition, Basel entered the 2009–10 UEFA Europa League in the second qualifying round, defeating FC Santa Coloma 7–1 on aggregate. They then overcame KR Reykjavík 5–3 on aggregate in the third qualifying round and FK Baku 8–2 on aggregate in the play-off round. Basel were drawn into Group E alongside Roma, Fulham, and CSKA Sofia.

Basel began the group stage with a 2–0 home win against Roma, followed by a 1–0 defeat away to Fulham. They defeated CSKA Sofia 2–0 away and 3–1 at home but lost the return leg against Roma 2–1. In the final group match, Basel were defeated 3–2 at home by Fulham, finishing third in the group and being eliminated from the competition. Fulham subsequently reached the final, where they lost 2–1 after extra time to Atlético Madrid.

=== 118th season, Fink ===
Thorsten Fink remained head coach for his second consecutive season. Four players were promoted from the U-21 team: Matthias Baron, Janick Kamber, and the brothers Taulant and Granit Xhaka. Key transfers included Gilles Yapi from Young Boys and Yann Sommer, who re-joined Basel following a loan spell at Grasshopper Club Zürich. During the winter break, Aleksandar Dragović transferred from Austria Wien.

Basel's primary aim in the domestic league was to retain the championship. The season began on 20 July with a 3–2 home win against Zurich. After winning their first three matches, Basel suffered a 0–1 away defeat to Bellinzona and a 1–4 home defeat to Luzern, leaving them in mid-table. Basel then remained undefeated for the next nine rounds, though five draws limited their progress. The first half concluded with a 1–2 loss to Grasshopper, leaving the team mid-table.

Following the winter break, Basel began with a 3–2 victory over Thun and entered their strongest phase of the season, recording eight consecutive league victories. The team suffered only one defeat in the second half, leading to a title race with Zurich. Both clubs exchanged the top position multiple times, and the championship was ultimately decided in the final match of the season, with Basel securing the title.

In the 2010–11 Swiss Cup, Basel entered as defending champions. They advanced to the quarter-finals by defeating FC Mendrisio-Stabio 5–0, Yverdon-Sports 2–0, and Servette 4–3 on penalties. In the quarter-final, Basel faced Biel-Bienne at the Gurzelen Stadion with a sold-out crowd of 6,500. Basel fielded a rotated lineup, with Gilles Yapi the only regular starter. Despite taking the lead before halftime, Basel lost 1–3, missing the opportunity to defend the cup.

As Swiss champions, Basel entered the 2010–11 UEFA Champions League in the third qualifying round, aiming to reach the group stage and, if possible, the knockout stage. They defeated Debreceni 2–0 and 3–1 in the third round, and Sheriff Tiraspol 3–0 and 1–0 in the play-off. Basel were drawn into Group E with Bayern Munich, Roma, and CFR Cluj.

Basel lost 2–1 away to Cluj and 2–1 at home to Bayern Munich. They defeated Roma 3–1 away, but lost the return match 3–2. A 1–0 win over Cluj gave Basel an advantage, but a final 1–0 defeat away to Bayern left them third in the group, transferring them to the UEFA Europa League knockout stage. In the round of 32, Basel faced Spartak Moscow, losing 4–3 on aggregate after a 1–1 draw in the second leg. Basel achieved their primary aim of reaching the Champions League group stage and extended their European campaign into the Europa League knockout stage, marking a successful continental season.

=== 119th season, Fink to Vogel ===
At the club's AGM, Gisela "Gigi" Oeri announced that she would step down as club president. At an extraordinary AGM of FC Basel Holding AG on 16 January 2012, she transferred her shares to vice chairman Bernhard Heusler, finance chief Stephan Werthmüller, and sporting director Georg Heitz.

At the start of the season, German Thorsten Fink remained head coach for his third consecutive season. Fabian Frei returned after spending the previous season on loan. Incoming transfers included Radoslav Kováč, Park Joo-ho, Stephan Andrist, and Kay Voser. On 13 October, Fink left the club to join Hamburger SV, taking Basel's U-21 coach Patrick Rahmen with him as his assistant. Former assistant Heiko Vogel was promoted to head coach in his place.

Basel entered the 2011–12 Swiss Super League as defending champions, with the objective of retaining the title. The season began on 16 July with a 1–1 away draw against Young Boys. The start was challenging, with three draws and two losses in the first six league matches. After regrouping under Fink, Basel won ten and drew two of the following twelve matches. The first half of the season concluded on 11 December with a 1–1 home draw against Neuchâtel Xamax, keeping Basel at the top of the league.

Following the winter break, Basel maintained an undefeated run, equalling the Swiss record for the longest undefeated streak (26 games), previously held by Grasshoppers, after defeating Grasshoppers 6–3 on 12 May 2012. Despite a 2–1 loss to Young Boys on the final day, Basel successfully defended their Super League title.

In the 2011–12 Swiss Cup, Basel began against amateur side FC Eschenbach, winning 4–0. They then defeated FC Schötz 5–1, Wil 3–2, and Lausanne-Sport 5–2 to reach the semi-finals, where they overcame FC Winterthur 2–1 at a sold-out Stadion Schützenwiese with 8,500 spectators. In the final, Basel faced FC Luzern at the Stade de Suisse, Wankdorf, with 30,100 in attendance. After a 1–1 draw in extra time, Basel won 4–2 on penalties, with Yann Sommer saving two spot-kicks to secure the club's 11th Swiss Cup title.

As Swiss champions, Basel entered the 2011–12 UEFA Champions League group stage in Group C alongside Benfica, Manchester United, and Oțelul Galați. Basel began with a 2–1 home victory over Oțelul Galați. In the second match at Old Trafford, they drew 3–3 with Manchester United. Basel lost 2–0 to Benfica at home but drew 1–1 in the return fixture. A 3–2 away victory over Oțelul Galați set up a decisive final group match against Manchester United. Basel won 2–1, securing second place in the group and progression to the knockout stage.

In the round of 16, Basel faced Bayern Munich. Basel won the first leg 1–0 at St. Jakob-Park through a late goal by Valentin Stocker, but lost the return leg 7–0 in Munich, resulting in elimination from the competition.

=== 120th season, Vogel to Yakin ===
Heiko Vogel began the season as first team manager. Several players left the squad, including Beni Huggel and Scott Chipperfield, who retired from professional football, with Chipperfield joining local amateur club FC Aesch as player-coach. Massimo Colomba retired as a player and was appointed as Basel's new goalkeeper coach. Notable arrivals included Mohamed Salah from Al Mokawloon Al Arab SC and Marcelo Díaz from Universidad de Chile, while David Degen returned after four seasons with BSC Young Boys.

Basel aimed to win the Swiss Super League for the fourth consecutive season. The 2012–13 Swiss Super League campaign began on 13 July 2012 with an away match against Servette FC. The start was poor, with three wins, five draws, and one loss in the first nine games, leaving Basel in fourth place, eight points behind leaders Grasshoppers, a gap that increased to eleven points shortly afterward. On 15 October 2012, Basel replaced Vogel with Murat Yakin as manager. Under Yakin, the team’s form improved, and Basel closed the first half of the season in second place, four points behind Grasshoppers and one point ahead of FC Sion and FC St. Gallen.

In the second half, FC Sion and St. Gallen fell further behind, leaving Basel and Grasshoppers to contest the title. Basel eventually overtook Grasshoppers and secured the championship with three points to spare, achieving their fourth consecutive league title.

In the 2012–13 Swiss Cup, Basel entered as title holders. They defeated lower-tier clubs FC Amriswil, Chiasso, and Locarno in the opening rounds. In the quarter-finals, Basel won 2–1 away to Thun after extra time, and in the semi-finals defeated Sion 1–0. In the final against Grasshoppers, the match ended 1–1 after extra time, and Grasshoppers won the trophy on penalties. Basel reached the final, but were denied the title in the shootout.

In European competition, Basel entered the 2012–13 UEFA Champions League in the qualifying phase. After defeating Flora Tallinn in the second qualifying round and Molde FK in the third, they faced CFR Cluj in the play-off round, losing both legs 2–1 and 1–0. Basel moved to the Europa League group stage, drawn in Group G with Sporting, Genk, and Videoton. Basel drew away games against Sporting and Genk, and won home games against Videoton and Sporting, finishing second in the group to advance to the knockout stage.

In the round of 32, Basel defeated Dnipro Dnipropetrovsk 2–0 at home and drew away, advancing 3–0 on aggregate. In the round of 16, they defeated Zenit Saint Petersburg 2–0 at home and lost 1–0 away, advancing 2–1 on aggregate.

In the quarter-finals, Basel faced Tottenham Hotspur. The first leg at White Hart Lane ended 2–2, and in the second leg at St. Jakob-Park, Basel won on penalties after a 2–2 draw in regulation and extra time. In the semi-finals, Basel played Chelsea, losing 2–1 at home and 3–1 away, for a 5–2 aggregate defeat. Chelsea went on to defeat Benfica 2–1 in the final. Basel’s progression to the semi-finals marked the first time a Swiss club had reached that stage, surpassing their initial objective of advancing in the Europa League.

=== 121st season, Chelsea ===
Murat Yakin served as first team manager. Significant signings at the start of the season included Behrang Safari returning from RSC Anderlecht and Matías Delgado from al-Jazira Club. Taulant Xhaka re-joined the squad after a loan spell, while Giovanni Sio joined from VfL Wolfsburg and Ivan Ivanov transferred from Partizan. Basel's primary aim for the season was to win the Swiss Super League for the fifth consecutive time.

The 2013–14 Swiss Super League season began on 13 July 2013 with a 3–1 away win against FC Aarau. Basel started slowly, and after two home wins and two away draws, they lost 1–2 at home to FC Zürich. After six games, Basel were in fourth place, six points behind Young Boys Bern. The team then went on a 28-game unbeaten league run. By the twelfth round, Basel had taken the league lead, and at the winter break, they were one point ahead of Luzern. Despite injuries, Basel maintained strong form and suffered their next league defeat only on 11 May. They finished the season seven points ahead of Grasshopper Club, securing their fifth consecutive league title.

In the 2013–14 Swiss Cup, Basel aimed to win the trophy after being runners-up the previous year. In the early rounds, they defeated lower-league sides BSC Old Boys, FC Münsingen, and FC Tuggen. In the quarter-final, Basel won 6–0 against Le Mont and advanced past Luzern 1–0 in the semi-final. In the final against Zürich at Stade de Suisse before 23,312 spectators, Basel lost 2–0 in extra time after a controversial red card for Giovanni Sio left the team with nine players. Zürich claimed their eighth Swiss Cup, marking a second consecutive final defeat for Basel.

Basel entered the 2013–14 UEFA Champions League in the qualifying phase with the aim of reaching the group stage. They defeated Maccabi Tel Aviv 4–3 on aggregate in the third qualifying round and Ludogorets Razgrad 6–2 in the play-offs. Basel were drawn into Group E with Chelsea, Schalke 04, and Steaua București. On matchday 1, Basel defeated Chelsea 2–1 at Stamford Bridge, marking Chelsea's first-ever loss in an opening Champions League group game. Basel then lost 0–1 at home to Schalke and drew both matches against Steaua București 1–1.

In the return fixture against Chelsea on matchday 5 at St. Jakob-Park (35,208 attendance), Mohamed Salah scored the winning goal in the 86th minute, securing a 1–0 victory. In the final group match against Schalke, Basel lost 2–0 and finished third in the group, moving to the Europa League round of 32.

In the Europa League knockout phase, Basel were drawn against Maccabi Tel Aviv, achieving a 0–0 away draw and a 3–0 home victory. In the round of 16, Basel faced Red Bull Salzburg. Injuries forced Basel to field a weakened side, yet they secured a 0–0 home draw and a 2–1 away win. In the quarter-finals, Basel defeated Valencia 3–0 at home, but lost 5–0 in the return leg after being reduced to nine men, resulting in elimination. Despite the defeat, Basel's European campaign was considered successful, as it surpassed initial expectations. Sevilla won the tournament, defeating Benfica on penalties in the final.

=== 122nd season, Paulo Sousa ===
Basel appointed Paulo Sousa as the new first team manager, signing a three-year contract on 28 May 2014.

The club's primary signings for the season were Tomáš Vaclík from Sparta Prague, Yoichiro Kakitani from Cerezo Osaka, Derlis González from Benfica, and Shkëlzen Gashi from Grasshopper. Additional arrivals included Luca Zuffi from Thun and Walter Samuel from Internazionale on a free transfer.

Basel began the 2014–15 Swiss Super League season with a 3–1 away victory against Aarau on 19 July 2014. The team won the following three matches—two at home against Luzern and Zürich, and one away against Thun—before losing 0–2 at home to St. Gallen. Wins against Sion and Young Boys were followed by a 0–1 defeat at Letzigrund to Grasshopper. Early criticism of Sousa emerged due to extensive player and position rotation, which he described as "a process."

Following a series of victories, Basel regained form, including a 2–1 away win against second-placed Zürich in round 17, with Shkëlzen Gashi scoring both goals. Basel ended the first half of the season with 41 points, leading the table by eight points over Zürich and Young Boys. In the second half, Basel continued strongly despite a home draw against Sion and a defeat against Young Boys at the Stade de Suisse. The team ultimately won the championship by a 12-point margin over Young Boys and 25 points over third-placed Zürich, achieving their primary objective.

In the 2014–15 Swiss Cup, Basel aimed to win the trophy after losing the previous two finals. The club defeated CS Italien, Winterthur, Wohlen, and Münsingen in the earlier rounds. In the semi-final, Basel beat St. Gallen 3–1.

The final, played on 7 June 2015 at a sold-out St. Jakob-Park before 35,674 spectators, saw Basel lose 0–3 to Sion. Goals were scored by Moussa Konaté (18′), Edimilson Fernandes (50′), and Carlitos (60′). Despite reaching the final, Basel suffered a third consecutive Swiss Cup defeat.

Basel competed in the 2014–15 UEFA Champions League group stage with the objective of reaching the knockout phase. Drawn into Group B alongside Real Madrid, Liverpool, and Ludogorets Razgrad, Basel lost 1–5 away to Real Madrid on matchday 1. They won 1–0 at home against Liverpool and drew 1–1 away to Ludogorets, before winning 4–0 in the return leg. Basel lost 0–1 at home to Real Madrid and drew 1–1 away to Liverpool, finishing second in the group and advancing to the knockout phase.

In the round of 16, Basel faced Porto. The first leg at St. Jakob-Park ended 1–1, with Derlis Gonzalez scoring for Basel and Danilo converting a penalty for Porto. In the return leg at Estádio do Dragão, Basel were defeated 0–4, with goals from Yacine Brahimi (14′), Héctor Herrera, Casemiro, and Vincent Aboubakar, ending Basel's Champions League campaign.

=== 123rd season, Urs Fischer ===
On 18 June 2015, Basel announced Urs Fischer as the new first team head coach on a three-year contract. New signings included Michael Lang from Grasshopper, Daniel Høegh from Odense, Zdravko Kuzmanović from Internazionale, Manuel Akanji from FC Winterthur, Marc Janko on a free transfer from Sydney FC, and Mirko Salvi returning from loan to FC Biel-Bienne. Matías Delgado was named captain, with Marek Suchý as vice-captain.

Basel began the season strongly, winning their first eight matches, scoring 22 goals and conceding seven. Their first defeat came in the Stade de Suisse, 3–4 against Young Boys. After this defeat, Basel won four of their next five matches, with a draw against Zürich at Letzigrund. The team suffered their first home defeat in early November against GC. By the winter break, Basel led the league with 43 points, ten ahead of Grasshopper and 15 ahead of Young Boys. The second half of the season began with three consecutive wins, and across the final 15 matches, Basel won 11 and drew four. A 2–0 home win against Sion on 30 April gave Basel a 16-point lead with five games remaining. Despite losing two of their final three matches, Basel secured the championship, followed by Young Boys in second and Luzern third, while Zürich were relegated.

In the 2015–16 Swiss Cup, Basel aimed to win after finishing as runners-up in the previous three seasons. They progressed past lower-tier teams Meyrin, YF Juventus, and SV Muttenz to reach the quarter-finals. Against Sion, Basel came from behind to 2–2, and Marc Janko scored a penalty in extra time. However, Basel lost 4–3 on penalties as Birkir Bjarnason and Walter Samuel missed their attempts.

In the Champions League, Basel entered in the third qualifying round and defeated Lech Poznań 4–1 on aggregate. In the play-off round, Basel drew both matches against Maccabi Tel Aviv and were eliminated on away goals, dropping into the Europa League. Drawn in Group I with Fiorentina, Lech Poznań, and Belenenses, Basel won away against Fiorentina and at home versus Lech Poznań. They lost at home 1–2 to Belenenses but won the return leg 2–0. A 2–2 draw at home against Fiorentina and a 1–0 away win over Lech Poznań secured Basel as group winners. During the match against Lech Poznań, Walter Samuel made his 100th UEFA club appearance, and Mirko Salvi debuted after replacing an injured Tomáš Vaclík.

In the round of 32, Basel faced Saint-Étienne, losing the away leg 3–2 but winning 2–1 at home, advancing on away goals. In the round of 16, Basel were drawn against defending Europa League champions Sevilla. The first leg at St. Jakob-Park ended 0–0, but Sevilla won the return leg 3–0, scoring three goals within minutes in the first half. Basel’s European campaign ended here, having reached the round of 16 after winning their group and progressing past Saint-Étienne.

== See also ==
- FC Basel
- List of FC Basel players
- List of FC Basel seasons
- Football in Switzerland

== Sources ==
- Die ersten 125 Jahre / 2018. Publisher: Josef Zindel im Friedrich Reinhardt Verlag, Basel. ISBN 978-3-7245-2305-5
- FC Basel Archiv / Verein "Basler Fussballarchiv"
