= Niko Geldner =

German-Swiss biologist

- Born: 1972 (age 53–54); Frankfurt am Main, Germany
- Education: Ph.D. at the University of Tübingen, Germany
- Scientific career
- Fields: Plant biology, cell biology, genetics, arabidopsis
- Workplaces: University of Lausanne
- Website: https://wp.unil.ch/geldnerlab/

Niko Geldner (born in 1972 in Frankfurt am Main) is a German-Swiss biologist specialised in the study of Plant Cell and Developmental Biology. He is a full professor and the director of the plant cell biology laboratory at the University of Lausanne.

== Education and career ==
Geldner did his undergraduate studies in the Universities of Mainz, Bordeaux and Tübingen. At the University of Tübingen, he started to work in the laboratory of Gerd Juergens where he received his PhD in 2003 for his work on the role of the ARF-GEF GNOM and its role in the localisation of the PIN1 polar auxin transporter. After a postdoc at the Salk Institute in La Jolla, California, in the lab of Joanne Chory, he started as an assistant professor at the University of Lausanne in 2007, where he was promoted Full Professor in 2018. At the University of Lausanne, Geldner is director of the doctoral school of the faculty of biology and medicine since 2012.

Geldner was elected EMBO member in 2017. In 2021, he was awarded a European Research Council (ERC) Advanced Grant, after receiving previously a ERC Starting and a ERC Consolidator Grant.

== Research ==
Geldner's research at the University of Lausanne is focused on root endodermis, specifically the formation of the Casparian strips and suberin lamellae, which are the protective extracellular diffusion barriers formed by this cell layer. His team identified a group of transmembrane proteins called 'CASPs' (Casparian strip membrane domain proteins), due to their location to the Casparian Strips.

More recently, Geldner and his collaborators uncovered, using a forward genetic screen, a new signaling pathway, initiated by post-translationally sulfated endogenous peptides.

== Selected publications ==
=== Polar auxin transport ===
Geldner, N., Friml, J., Stierhof, YD. et al. Auxin transport inhibitors block PIN1 cycling and vesicle trafficking. Nature 413, 425–428 (2001).

Geldner, N., Anders N., Wolters H., et al. The Arabidopsis GNOM ARF-GEF Mediates Endosomal Recycling, Auxin Transport, and Auxin-Dependent Plant Growth, Cell, 112, 219-230

=== Endomembrane system ===
Rapid, combinatorial analysis of membrane compartments in intact plants with a multicolor marker set. N Geldner, V Dénervaud‐Tendon, DL Hyman, U Mayer, YD Stierhof. The Plant Journal 59 (1), 169-178

=== Endodermis ===
Doblas VG, Smakowska-Luzan E, Fujita S, Alassimone J, Barberon M, Madalinski M, Belkhadir Y, Geldner N. Root diffusion barrier control by a vasculature-derived peptide binding to the SGN3 receptor. Science. 2017 Jan 20;355(6322):280-284.

Adaptation of Root Function by Nutrient-Induced Plasticity of Endodermal Differentiation.Barberon M, Vermeer JE, De Bellis D, Wang P, Naseer S, Andersen TG, Humbel BM, Nawrath C, Takano J, Salt DE, Geldner N. Cell. 2016 Jan 28;164(3):447-59.

Lee Y, Rubio MC, Alassimone J, Geldner N. A mechanism for localized lignin deposition in the endodermis. Cell. 2013 Apr 11;153(2):402-12.

Naseer S, Lee Y, Lapierre C, Franke R, Nawrath C, Geldner N. Casparian strip diffusion barrier in Arabidopsis is made of a lignin polymer without suberin. Proceeding of the National Academy Sci U S A. 2012 Jun 19;109(25):10101-6.

Roppolo D, De Rybel B, Dénervaud Tendon V, Pfister A, Alassimone J, Vermeer JEM, Yamazaki M, Stierhof Y, Beeckman T, Geldner N. A novel protein family directs Casparian Strip formation in the endodermis. Nature. 2011 May 19;473(7347):380-3.

=== Root-microbe interaction ===
Zhou F, Emonet A, Dénervaud Tendon V, Marhavy P, Wu D, Lahaye T, Geldner N. Co-incidence of Damage and Microbial Patterns Controls Localized Immune Responses in Roots.Cell. 2020 Feb 6;180(3):440-453.e18.
