= Heinrich Preiswerk =

Swiss footballer (born 1876)

Personal information
- Full name: Heinrich Preiswerk
- Date of birth: 19 May 1876
- Place of birth: Switzerland
- Date of death: unknown

Senior career*
Years	Team	Apps	(Gls)
1894–1896	FC Basel	(Note: League: up until 1898 there was no league football in Switzerland.)	
- * Club domestic league appearances and goals

Heinrich Preiswerk (born 19 May 1876) was a Swiss footballer who played for FC Basel in the 1890s.

== Football career ==
FC Basel was founded on 15 November 1893 and Preiswerk joined the club about a year later, during their 1894–95 season. He played his first game for the club in the home game in the Stadion Schützenmatte on 5 May 1895 as Basel won 2–0 against Abstinenten FC Patria Basel.

He stayed with the club for two seasons and during this time Preiswerk played three games for Basel without scoring a goal. (Note: Scorers: many pre-First World War game sheets no longer exist or are incomplete and so, many line ups and most goal scorers in this period remain unknown.)

== Notes ==
=== Sources ===
- Rotblau: Jahrbuch Saison 2017/2018. Publisher: FC Basel Marketing AG. ISBN 978-3-7245-2189-1
- Die ersten 125 Jahre. Publisher: Josef Zindel im Friedrich Reinhardt Verlag, Basel. ISBN 978-3-7245-2305-5
- Verein "Basler Fussballarchiv" Homepage
