= John Tollmann =

Swiss footballer and businessman

Personal information
- Full name: Kurt Johann 'John' Tollmann
- Date of birth: 29 June 1863
- Date of death: 1924
- Place of death: Paris, France
- Position: Goalkeeper

Senior career*
Years	Team	Apps	(Gls)
1893–1898	FC Basel	(Note: League: up until 1898 there was no league football in Switzerland.)	
- * Club domestic league appearances and goals

Kurt Johann 'John' Tollmann (29 June 1863 – 1924) was a Swiss businessman and owned his own company in Basel, John Tollmann & Co, a tea company and had tea plantations in Ceylon (Sri Lanka). Tollmann was founder member of FC Basel. He was long-time footballer in their first team and played as goalkeeper in the 1890s. He also acted as referee and was the first secretary-treasurer of the Swiss Football Association.

== Football career ==
Tollmann was member of the Basel rowing club and during a visit to England had seen the new football game. After a newspaper advert, there was a meeting on 15 November 1893 and the Fussball Club Basel was founded. Tollmann attended the founders meeting and joined the team that evening.

The first football match that the club held was on 10 December against the football team of the club RTV/Realschüler-Turnverein (secondary school student gymnastics club). Tollmann played in that match, which the FCB won two goals to nil.

On 21 October 1894 Basel played their first game in Zürich, the city on the Limmat, against Grasshopper Club Zürich, which was very positively commentated by GC in the local newspaper: It really deserves credit for the fact that they dare to travel so far, despite their short existence. Our colleagues in Basel have the same principles as we do. They find that one can only learn the game properly through playing many matches and possibly suffering defeats. Therefore, we pay the highest appreciation to the young club, that has to make significant sacrifices in order to achieve this aim. Despite all expressions of respect, the game on the Zurich swamp-like underground ended with a 0–4 defeat for Basel. After the heated fight between the two teams, the guests were entertained and then accompanied by the hosts to an evening drink and finally to the train station. Because of this, the FCB players looked forward to the return match against GC two weeks later. Over a dozen members gathered at the train station in Basel to accompany the guests through the city and to have a "morning pint" before the match. The spectators were shown an attractive game, which FCB only lost 0–3, they had improved compared to the first leg. Basel put the ball in the opponents’ goal twice before half time, but both goals were ruled offside. Tollmann was Basel goalkeeper in the first match and then acted as referee in the second. As in Zürich two weeks earlier, in Basel too, after the game they treated themselves to a dinner and the opponents were also accompanied back to the train station.

During their second season, the club organised twelve matches and Tollmann played in nine of them. At the end of this season the Swiss Football Association (ASF-SFV) was founded, FC Basel was founder member. FCB club chairman Roland Geldner, Josy Ebinger and Tollman were the club's driving forces in this adventure. Tollman became the first secretary-treasurer of the ASF-SFV.

In their 1895–96 season the club arranged ten matches, Tollmann played in eight of these. Tollmann played active football until the club's 1897–98 season. He played his last match for the team in the home game in the Landhof on 24 October 1897 as Basel won 7–0 against Biel-Bienne. Between the years 1893 and 1998 Tollmann played a total of 23 games for Basel.

== Private life ==
As businessman Tollmann owned his own company in Basel, a tea company. The firm John Tollmann & Co had their own tea plantations in Ceylon (Sri Lanka). They were proud of the fact that for a time they were the only Swiss company that had their own plantations and used this fact in their advertisements. For the company he made many business trips. Tollmann died in 1924 while he was in Paris, France.

== Notes ==
=== Sources ===
- Rotblau: Jahrbuch Saison 2017/2018. Publisher: FC Basel Marketing AG. ISBN 978-3-7245-2189-1
- Die ersten 125 Jahre. Publisher: Josef Zindel im Friedrich Reinhardt Verlag, Basel. ISBN 978-3-7245-2305-5
- Verein "Basler Fussballarchiv" Homepage
