= H. Siegrist =

Swiss footballer (born 1869)

Personal information
- Date of birth: 1869
- Place of birth: Switzerland

Senior career*
Years	Team	Apps	(Gls)
1893–1896	FC Basel	(Note: League: up until 1898 there was no league football in Switzerland.)	
- * Club domestic league appearances and goals

H. Siegrist (born in 1869) was a Swiss footballer who played in the 1890s.

== Football career ==
FC Basel was founded on 15 November 1893 and H. Siegrist joined the club a few weeks later during their 1893–94 season.

The first football match that the club held was in the Landhof on 10 December against the football team of the club RTV/Realschüler-Turnverein, a secondary school student gymnastics club. Siegrist played in this match. He scored his first goal for the club in the same game, the second goal of the match, as Basel won by two goals to nil.

Siegrist stayed with the club for three seasons and during this time he played 14 games for Basel scoring at least two goals. (Note: Scorers: many pre-First World War game sheets no longer exist or are incomplete and so, many line ups and most goal scorers in this period remain unknown.)

== Notes ==
=== Sources ===
- Rotblau: Jahrbuch Saison 2017/2018. Publisher: FC Basel Marketing AG. ISBN 978-3-7245-2189-1
- Die ersten 125 Jahre. Publisher: Josef Zindel im Friedrich Reinhardt Verlag, Basel. ISBN 978-3-7245-2305-5
- Verein "Basler Fussballarchiv" Homepage

(NB: Despite all efforts, the editors of these books and the authors in "Basler Fussballarchiv" have failed to be able to identify all the players, their date and place of birth or date and place of death, who played in the games during the early years of FC Basel)
