= Wilhelm Götz =

Swiss footballer

Personal information
- Full name: Wilhelm Götz
- Date of birth: unknown
- Place of birth: Switzerland

Senior career*
Years	Team	Apps	(Gls)
1894–1896	FC Basel	(Note: League: up until 1898 there was no league football in Switzerland.)	
- * Club domestic league appearances and goals

Wilhelm Götz (date of birth unknown) was a Swiss footballer who played for FC Basel in the 1890s.

== Football career ==
FC Basel was founded on 15 November 1893 and Götz joined the club a few months later during their 1893–94 season.

He played his first game for the club in the home game in the Stadion Schützenmatte on 5 May 1895 as Basel won 2–0 against Abstinenten FC Patria Basel.

He stayed with the club for two seasons and during this time Götz played a total of five games for Basel without scoring a goal. (Note: Scorers: many pre-First World War game sheets no longer exist or are incomplete and so, many line ups and most goal scorers in this period remain unknown.)

== Notes ==
=== Sources ===
- Rotblau: Jahrbuch Saison 2017/2018. Publisher: FC Basel Marketing AG. ISBN 978-3-7245-2189-1
- Die ersten 125 Jahre. Publisher: Josef Zindel im Friedrich Reinhardt Verlag, Basel. ISBN 978-3-7245-2305-5
- Verein "Basler Fussballarchiv" Homepage

(NB: Despite all efforts, the editors of these books and the authors in "Basler Fussballarchiv" have failed to be able to identify all the players, their date and place of birth or date and place of death, who played in the games during the early years of FC Basel)
