= Fritz Schäublin =

Swiss philologist (1867–1951)

Personal information
- Full name: Fritz Schäublin
- Date of birth: 1 February 1867
- Place of birth: Switzerland
- Date of death: 1951
- Place of death: Basel, Switzerland
- Positions: Midfielder; striker

Senior career*
Years	Team	Apps	(Gls)
1893–1895	FC Basel	(Note: Up until 1898 there was no league football in Switzerland.)	
- * Club domestic league appearances and goals

Fritz Schäublin (1 February 1867 – 1951) was the rector of the humanistic grammar school in Basel. He was founder member of FC Basel and played football with them as striker or as midfielder. With his excellent skills he served the club in various offices for many years. He was founder of their tennis department.

== Football career ==
Schäublin was member of the Basel rowing club and he had visited England and there he had seen the new football game. After a newspaper advert, there was a meeting on 15 November 1893 and the Fussball Club Basel was founded. Schäublin was participant of this founders meeting and he joined the team that evening. Schäublin trained with the team and played his first game for the club in the home game on 14 October 1894 as Basel played a goalless draw with RTV/Realschüler-Turnverein, a secondary school student gymnastics club.

On 21 October 1894 Basel played their first game in Zürich, the city on the Limmat, against Grasshopper Club Zürich. This was very positively commentated by GC in the local newspaper: It really deserves credit for the fact that they dare to travel so far, despite their short existence. Our colleagues in Basel have the same principles as we do. They find that one can only learn the game properly through playing many matches and possibly suffering defeats. Therefore, we pay the highest appreciation to the young club, that has to make significant sacrifices in order to achieve this aim. Despite all expressions of respect, the game on the Zurich swamp-like underground ended with a 0–4 defeat for Basel. After the heated fight between the two teams, the guests were entertained and then accompanied by the hosts to an evening drink and finally to the train station. Because of this, the FCB players looked forward to the return match against GC two weeks later. Over a dozen members gathered at the train station in Basel to accompany the guests through the city and to have a "morning pint" before the match. The spectators were shown an attractive game, which FCB only lost 0–3, they had improved compared to the first leg. It was noteworthy that Basel put the ball in the opponents’ goal twice before half time, but the both goals fell from an offside position. Schäublin played in both these matches. As in Zürich two weeks earlier, in Basel too, after the game they treated themselves to a dinner and the opponents were also accompanied back to the train station.

Schäublin scored his first goal for his club during the game between these two matches on 28 October 1894 in the home game as Basel played a 1–1 draw with RTV Basel. Schäublin only played active football for the first two years and during this time he played four games for Basel scoring that one goal.

== Private life ==
For many years Schäublin was the highly respected rector of the humanistic grammar school in Basel. He remained with the club as non-playing staff and with his professional skills he served the club in various offices for many years. He was founder of the club's tennis department.

== Notes ==
=== Sources ===
- Rotblau: Jahrbuch Saison 2017/2018. Publisher: FC Basel Marketing AG. ISBN 978-3-7245-2189-1
- Die ersten 125 Jahre. Publisher: Josef Zindel im Friedrich Reinhardt Verlag, Basel. ISBN 978-3-7245-2305-5
- Verein "Basler Fussballarchiv" Homepage
