= Max Born (footballer) =

Swiss footballer (born 1871)

Personal information
- Full name: Emil Max Born
- Date of birth: 21 December 1871
- Place of birth: Switzerland
- Date of death: unknown
- Positions: Defender; midfielder

Senior career*
Years	Team	Apps	(Gls)
1893–1895	FC Basel	(Note: Up until 1898 there was no league football in Switzerland.)	
- * Club domestic league appearances and goals

Max Born (born 21 December 1871) was a Swiss footballer who played for FC Basel in the 1890s. He played as defender or midfielder.

== Football career ==
During a visit to England Born had seen the new football game. After a newspaper advert, there was a meeting on 15 November 1893 and the Fussball Club Basel was founded. Born attended the founders meeting and joined the team that evening.

Born trained with the team and played his first game for the club in the home game on 14 October 1894 as Basel played a goalless draw with RTV/Realschüler-Turnverein, a secondary school student gymnastics club.

On 21 October 1894 Basel played their first game in Zürich, the city on the Limmat, against Grasshopper Club Zürich. This was very positively commentated by GC in the local newspaper: It really deserves credit for the fact that they dare to travel so far, despite their short existence. Our colleagues in Basel have the same principles as we do. They find that one can only learn the game properly through playing many matches and possibly suffering defeats. Therefore, we pay the highest appreciation to the young club, that has to make significant sacrifices in order to achieve this aim. Despite all expressions of respect, the game on the Zurich swamp-like underground ended with a 0–4 defeat for Basel. After the heated fight between the two teams, the guests were entertained and then accompanied by the hosts to an evening drink and finally to the train station. Because of this, the FCB players looked forward to the return match against GC two weeks later. Over a dozen members gathered at the train station in Basel to accompany the guests through the city and to have a "morning pint" before the match. The spectators were shown an attractive game, which FCB only lost 0–3, they had improved compared to the first leg. It was noteworthy that Basel put the ball in the opponents’ goal twice before half time, but the both goals fell from an offside position. Born played in both these matches. As in Zürich two weeks earlier, in Basel too, after the game they treated themselves to a dinner and the opponents were also accompanied back to the train station.

Curiosity to the home match on 28 October 1894 against RTV/Realschüler-Turnverein. The RTV team arrived, but only had ten players. FCB therefore, lent Born to their opponents for the match, which ended with a 1–1 draw. Born stayed with the FC Basel until May 1895 and during this time he played four games for the club and one game against them, without scoring a goal. (Note: Scorers: many pre-First World War game sheets no longer exist or are incomplete and so, many line ups and most goal scorers in this period remain unknown.)
