= Ferdinand Isler =

Swiss footballer and professor (1866-1951)

Personal information
- Full name: Ferdinand Isler
- Date of birth: 26 December 1866
- Place of birth: Switzerland
- Date of death: 14 December 1951 (aged 84)
- Place of death: Frauenfeld, Switzerland
- Position: Defender

Senior career*
Years	Team	Apps	(Gls)
1893–1896	FC Basel	(Note: League: up until 1898 there was no league football in Switzerland.)	
- * Club domestic league appearances and goals

Ferdinand Isler (26 December 1866 – 14 December 1951) was a professor at the canton school in Frauenfeld. He was founder member of FC Basel and became the team’s first captain. He later became actuary of the club. He was a great propagandist. He wrote brochures about the football game and translated the English rules of the game into German. He was one of the first sports journalists.

== Football career ==
Isler studied philosophy at the University of Zurich, graduation with certificate on 22 July 1885. He then moved to Basel, was member of the Basel rowing club and during a visit to England he had seen the new football game. After a newspaper advert, there was a meeting on 15 November 1893 and the Fussball Club Basel was founded. Among the participants of the founders meeting was Ferdinand Isler and he joined the team that evening. Isler trained with the team and they played an internal match between two ad hoc FCB teams. At the club’s second meeting Roland Geldner was elected as the club's first chairman and Isler named as the team's first captain.

The first football match that the club held was on 10 December against the football team of the club RTV/Realschüler-Turnverein (secondary school student gymnastics club). Isler played in that match, which the FCB won two goals to nil.

On 21 October 1894 Basel played their first game in Zürich, the city on the Limmat, against Grasshopper Club Zürich, which was very positively commentated by GC in the local newspaper: It really deserves credit for the fact that they dare to travel so far, despite their short existence. Our colleagues in Basel have the same principles as we do. They find that one can only learn the game properly through playing many matches and possibly suffering defeats. Therefore, we pay the highest appreciation to the young club, that has to make significant sacrifices in order to achieve this aim. Despite all expressions of respect, the game on the Zurich swamp-like underground ended with a 0–4 defeat for Basel. After the heated fight between the two teams, the guests were entertained and then accompanied by the hosts to an evening drink and finally to the train station. Because of this, the FCB players looked forward to the return match against GC two weeks later. Over a dozen members gathered at the train station in Basel to accompany the guests through the city and to have a "morning pint" before the match. The spectators were shown an attractive game, which FCB only lost 0–3, they had improved compared to the first leg. It was noteworthy that Basel put the ball in the opponents’ goal twice before half time, but the both goals fell from an offside position. Isler played in both matches. As in Zürich two weeks earlier, in Basel too, after the game they treated themselves to a dinner and the opponents were also accompanied back to the train station.

Isler played for the team for three years, his last match with the team was in the away game on 26 April 1896 as Basel won 3–2 against FC Excelsior Zürich. In his three years with the team Isler played a total of at least 17 games for Basel. (Note: Scorers: many pre-First World War game sheets no longer exist or are incomplete and so, many line ups and most goal scorers in this period remain unknown.)

== Private life ==
In 1893, Isler set himself the task of devoting himself to the rules of football, as these did not yet exist in Switzerland at the time. Isler ordered the rules in English, translated them and published articles about the "football game" in various newspapers.

Isler stayed with the club as non-playing functiontier, he also became actuary of the club. He was a publicist and wrote brochures about the football game. He was one of the first sports journalists and later was also a professor at the canton school in Frauenfeld.

== Notes ==
=== Sources ===
- Rotblau: Jahrbuch Saison 2017/2018. Publisher: FC Basel Marketing AG. ISBN 978-3-7245-2189-1
- Die ersten 125 Jahre. Publisher: Josef Zindel im Friedrich Reinhardt Verlag, Basel. ISBN 978-3-7245-2305-5
- Verein "Basler Fussballarchiv" Homepage
