= Wilhelm Glaser =

Swiss footballer (1887-1946)

Personal information
- Full name: Wilhelm Glaser
- Date of birth: 6 December 1887
- Place of birth: Basel, Switzerland
- Date of death: 31 May 1946 (aged 58)
- Place of death: Schlieren, Switzerland
- Positions: Defender; striker

Senior career*
Years	Team	Apps	(Gls)
1893–1898	FC Basel	(Note: League: up until 1898 there was no league football in Switzerland.)	
- * Club domestic league appearances and goals

Wilhelm Glaser (6 December 1874 – 31 May 1946) was a Swiss footballer who played for FC Basel in the 1890s. He played as forward or as defender.

== Football career ==
Glaser was member of the Basel rowing club and during a visit to England he had seen the new football game. After a newspaper advert, there was a meeting on 15 November 1893 and the Fussball Club Basel was founded. Glaser attended the founders meeting and joined the team that evening.

Glaser immediately started training with the team and the first football match that the club held was on 10 December against the football team of the club RTV/Realschüler-Turnverein, a secondary school student gymnastics club. Glaser played in the match and he was the club's very first goal scorer and at the end of the match they won by two goals to nil. Team mate Charles Volderauer, as businessman, had good connections and used them from the very beginning. As early as June 1894, he organised the journey to visit Strassburger FV. Glaser was with the group that travelled and played in the match, which ended with a 0–8 defeat.

On 21 October 1894, Basel played their first game in Zürich, the city on the Limmat, against Grasshopper Club Zürich. This was very positively commentated by GC in the local newspaper: It really deserves credit for the fact that they dare to travel so far, despite their short existence. Our colleagues in Basel have the same principles as we do. They find that one can only learn the game properly through playing many matches and possibly suffering defeats. Therefore, we pay the highest appreciation to the young club, that has to make significant sacrifices in order to achieve this aim. Despite all expressions of respect, the game on the Zurich swamp-like underground ended with a 0–4 defeat for Basel. After the heated fight between the two teams, the guests were entertained and then accompanied by the hosts to an evening drink and finally to the train station. Because of this, the FCB players looked forward to the return match against GC two weeks later. Over a dozen members gathered at the train station in Basel to accompany the guests through the city and to have a "morning pint" before the match. The spectators were shown an attractive game, which FCB only lost 0–3, they had improved compared to the first leg. Basel twice put the ball in the opponents’ goal before half time, but both goals were ruled offside. Glaser did not play in the first match, but played in the return fixture. As in Zürich two weeks earlier, in Basel too, after the game they treated themselves to a dinner and the opponents were also accompanied back to the train station.

During the early years, most match documentation is missing, not many goal scorers were noted. But the match on 17 November 1895 is noted and the team played hosts to Grasshopper Club who were regular opponents in the early days. Basel won the match 2–1 and Glaser netted both goals. Glaser stayed in the team until into their 1897–98 season. He played his last game with them on 7 November 1897 as Basel were defeated 7–0 by Grasshopper Club.

Between the years 1893 and 1897, Glaser played a total of 14 games for Basel scoring at least three goals. (Note: Scorers: many pre-First World War game sheets no longer exist or are incomplete and so, many line ups and most goal scorers in this period remain unknown.)

== Notes ==
=== Sources ===
- Rotblau: Jahrbuch Saison 2017/2018. Publisher: FC Basel Marketing AG. ISBN 978-3-7245-2189-1
- Die ersten 125 Jahre. Publisher: Josef Zindel im Friedrich Reinhardt Verlag, Basel. ISBN 978-3-7245-2305-5
- Verein "Basler Fussballarchiv" Homepage
