= Josy Ebinger =

Swiss-French businessman (1880–1955)

Personal information
- Date of birth: 26 March 1877
- Place of birth: Switzerland
- Date of death: 18 September 1955 (aged 78)
- Positions: Defender; midfielder

Senior career*
Years	Team	Apps	(Gls)
1893–1902	FC Basel	(Note: League: up until 1898 there was no league football in Switzerland.)	
- * Club domestic league appearances and goals

Josy Ebinger (26 March 1880 – 18 September 1955) was a Swiss-French businessman and founder member of FC Basel. He was long-time player in their first team and played as defender and midfielder. He was active as a club official in various offices and was club chairman from October 1902 to May 1903. He was vice president of the Swiss Football Association in 1900. As businessman he was a well-known personality in the city and held high honorary positions in his hometown.

== Biography ==
Ebinger was member of the Basel rowing club and during a visit to England had seen the new football game. He had also been member of the RTV/Realschüler-Turnverein (secondary school student gymnastics club) and had been instructed over the game by his gymnastics teacher, Adolf Glaz, at the then secondary school. But when students finished school, they could no longer stay member of the student association. After a newspaper advert, there was a meeting on 15 November 1893 and the Fussball Club Basel was founded. Ebinger attended the founders meeting and joined the team that evening.

The first football match that the club held was on 10 December against the football team of the afore mentioned gymnastics club RTV and Ebinger played in that match, which the FCB won two goals to nil.

During their second season, the club organised twelve matches and Ebinger played in eight of them. At the end of this season the Swiss Football Association (ASF-SFV) was founded, FC Basel was founder member. FCB club chairman Roland Geldner, John Tollman and Ebinger were the club's driving forces in this adventure. Tollman became the first secretary-treasurer of the ASF-SFV. In their 1895–96 season the club arranged ten matches, Ebinger played only in two of these.

The first edition of the official Swiss championship was played in the 1898–99 season as a knock out competition. Basel played against Old Boys in the central group semi-final. This was home game at the Landhof on 13 November 1898. It ended in 1–1 draw with their local rivals. It therefore required a replay. This replay was held in the Stadion Schützenmatte on 18 December 1898. This was also drawn 2–2, despite an agreed two times 20 minutes extra time. Because the Old Boys complained that the first FCB goal scored by Rudolf La Roche in the 10th minute had been scored by hand, they protested and the SFA had to deal with the matter. Subsequently, the protest was approved and awarded - and the disputed goal was simply deducted from the score to give the final result. Thus the Old Boys became the first forfait winners in Swiss football history. The Old Boys advanced to the finals, but the Anglo-American Club Zürich became Swiss champions.

In their following season, 1899–1900, Basel did not compete in the 1899–1900 Swiss Serie A, but contested 16 friendly matches. Ebinger played in three of these games. He was vice president of the Swiss Football Association (ASF-SFV) in 1900. For the team the 1900–01 season was a bad season. They competed in the Swiss championship, but ended the season in fifth position in the group stage. A curiosity in this season was the away game on 3 March 1901. This was an away game against Grasshopper Club and it ended in a 3–13 defeat. The reasons for this high defeat can be explained with the fact that one of the players missed the train and that the team played with a number of players from their reserve team. Nevertheless, to date this remains the teams’ highest and biggest defeat in the club’s history.

Ebinger played his last game in his active football career in January 1902 as Basel played an away game against FC Mulhouse. Ebinger was elected as FCB club chairman at the AGM in 1902. During the eight seasons with the club as active footballer, Ebinger played in at least 23 games for Basel without scoring a goal. (Note: Scorers: many pre-First World War game sheets no longer exist or are incomplete and so, many line ups and most goal scorers in this period remain unknown.)

== Notes ==
=== Sources ===
- Rotblau: Jahrbuch Saison 2017/2018. Publisher: FC Basel Marketing AG. ISBN 978-3-7245-2189-1
- Die ersten 125 Jahre. Publisher: Josef Zindel im Friedrich Reinhardt Verlag, Basel. ISBN 978-3-7245-2305-5
- Verein "Basler Fussballarchiv" Homepage
