= Max Geldner =

Swiss footballer (1875–1958)

Personal information
- Full name: Max Eugen Geldner
- Date of birth: 25 March 1875
- Date of death: 17 July 1958 (aged 83)
- Positions: Midfielder; striker

Senior career*
Years	Team	Apps	(Gls)
1893–1895	FC Basel	(Note: League: up until 1898 there was no league football in Switzerland.)	
- * Club domestic league appearances and goals

Max Geldner (25 March 1875 – 17 July 1958) was a Swiss footballer who played for FC Basel. He played as striker or as midfielder. He was a well-known personality in the city's business world.

== Football career ==
During a visit to England together with his brother, Roland Geldner, they had seen the new football game. His elder brother placed an advert in the local newspaper to arrange a meeting about founding the Football Club Basel. Max Geldner attended the founders meeting and joined the team that evening. His brother was appointed as the club's first president.

Geldner trained with the team and the first football match that the club held was on 10 December against the football team of the club RTV/Realschüler-Turnverein, a secondary school student gymnastics club. Geldner and both his brothers played in this match, which the FCB won two goals to nil.

On 21 October 1894 Basel played their first game in Zürich, the city on the Limmat, against Grasshopper Club Zürich. This was very positively commentated by GC in the local newspaper: It really deserves credit for the fact that they dare to travel so far, despite their short existence. Our colleagues in Basel have the same principles as we do. They find that one can only learn the game properly through playing many matches and possibly suffering defeats. Therefore, we pay the highest appreciation to the young club, that has to make significant sacrifices in order to achieve this aim. Despite all expressions of respect, the game on the Zurich swamp-like underground ended with a 0–4 defeat for Basel. After the heated fight between the two teams, the guests were entertained and then accompanied by the hosts to an evening drink and finally to the train station. Because of this, the FCB players looked forward to the return match against GC two weeks later. Over a dozen members gathered at the train station in Basel to accompany the guests through the city and to have a "morning pint" before the match. The spectators were shown an attractive game, which FCB only lost 0–3, they had improved compared to the first leg. Basel put the ball in the opponents’ goal twice before half time, but lost both goals due to breaches of the offside rule. Geldner did not play in the first match but was in the team for the second. As in Zürich two weeks earlier, in Basel too, after the game they treated themselves to a dinner and the opponents were also accompanied back to the train station.

Max Geldner stayed with the club for two years, his last match with the team was in the home game on 19 May 1895 as Basel won 6–0 against newly formed local rivals FC Old Boys Basel. During his time with the club Geldner played a total of six games for Basel without scoring a goal. (Note: Scorers: many pre-First World War game sheets no longer exist or are incomplete and so, many line ups and most goal scorers in this period remain unknown.)

== Notes ==
=== Sources ===
- Rotblau: Jahrbuch Saison 2017/2018. Publisher: FC Basel Marketing AG. ISBN 978-3-7245-2189-1
- Die ersten 125 Jahre. Publisher: Josef Zindel im Friedrich Reinhardt Verlag, Basel. ISBN 978-3-7245-2305-5
- Verein "Basler Fussballarchiv" Homepage

(NB: Despite all efforts, the editors of these books and the authors in "Basler Fussballarchiv" have failed to be able to identify all the players, their date and place of birth or date and place of death, who played in the games during the early years of FC Basel)
