= AS Strasbourg =

French football club

- Full name: Association Sportive de Strasbourg
- Nickname: SAS
- Founded: 19 May 1890; 135 years ago (as Fussball Klub Straßburg); 24 December 1898; 127 years ago (as Fussball Verein Straßburg); 1920; 106 years ago (as Association Sportive de Strasbourg)
- Ground: Stade Tivoli (de la Rotonde)
- Capacity: 400
- League: District 1 Alsace — Group A (10th tier)
Home colours	Away colours

Association Sportive de Strasbourg is a French football club from the city of Strasbourg in the Alsace region of France. It was formed in 1920 by the merging of two different club, which FV Straßburg, a German club founded in 1890 when the city was part of the German Empire, and Strasbourger FC Donar, founded in 1899. The team has played in both French and German football league system, as the political fortunes of the region have changed.

== History ==
Logo of FV Straßburg

Fussball Klub Straßburg was founded on 19 May 1890 and played in the VSFV (Verband Süddeutscher Fussballvereine or Federation of South German Football Teams). A merger with FC Celeritas Straßburg on 24 December 1898 led to the team being renamed Fussball Verein Straßburg. The club won the league title in 1899 with a 4:3 victory over Karlsruher FV. The two teams played a re-match in the following year's final, but the result has been lost to history. That same year FV became one of the founding members of the German Football Association (Deutscher Fussball Bund or German Football Association) at Leipzig. In 1902 the club's second team captured the VSFV second division title. From 1909 to 1912, the club played in the tier-one Südkreis-Liga.

The team's performance fell off over the next decade, but by 1917 Straßburg had resurfaced in the league playoff rounds, losing the 1917 final to Stuttgarter Kickers and going out in the semi-finals in 1918. After World War I Strasbourg was ceded to France as part of the territory of Alsace-Lorraine and FV Straßburg was removed from the German football scene in 1920 to play in the French leagues, first as Strasbourger FV, and following a union that same year with Strasbourger FC Donar (established 22 November 1899), as Association Sportive de Strasbourg.

During the interwar period AS Strasbourg played in the top flight regional Division d'Honneur Alsace and regularly delivered top-three finishes there. They participated in the league championship in 1926, 1927, and 1928, coming away as winners in 1926. After re-organization of French football leagues in 1932 Strasbourg played in lower divisions.

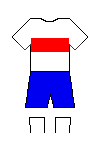
Team kit of FV Straßburg ca. 1940

The region was conquered and held briefly by Germany during World War II and FV Straßburg was one of several former German sides that returned to play in that country's football competition. Once again playing as Sportverein Straßburg 1890 the club made a single season appearance in the top flight Gauliga Elsaß in 1940–41. They won promotion back to the weakened Gauliga in 1944 but the division collapsed as conflict overtook the area.

The club resumed play as the Association Sportive de Strasbourg in late 1944 and enjoyed some success as a French amateur side through the 60s. Their latest honours, nearly a quarter century old, are a fourth division national title and a Coupe d'Alsace win in the early 80s.

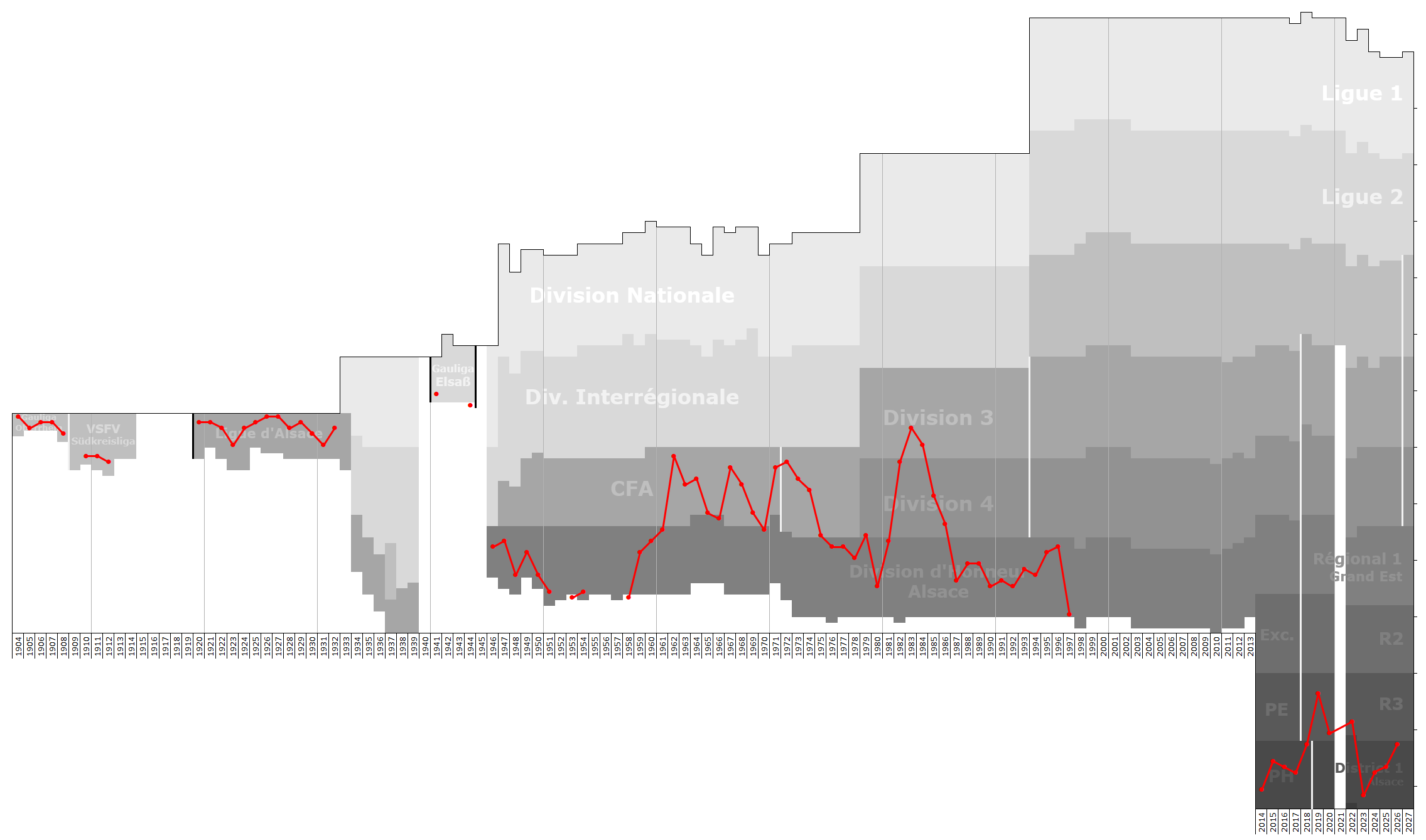
Historical league performance chart of AS Strasbourg

As of the 2025/26 season, AS Strasbourg plays in the District 1 Alsace, in the 10th tier of the French football pyramid.

In addition to fielding a football team, the club also has athletics and basketball departments.

== Honours ==
- Southern German football championship: 1899, 1900
- South German II division champions: 1902
- French IV division champions: 1982
- Alsace champions: 1926, 1961, 1966, 1970
- Coupe d'Alsace (Alsace Cup): 1954, 1965, 1966, 1983
- Bas-Rhin champions: 1956

== Notable players ==
- Goalkeeper Eberhard Illmer was the club's only international while a German team. He played his only match for Germany on 4 April 1909, as they beat Switzerland 1–0 in a friendly.
- In 1919, English coach Fred Pentland took charge of the club as it was rebuilt after the First World War. The following year he coached France at the Olympic Games before embarking on a successful career in Spanish football.
- Between 1920 and 1932, five players from the club played for France. Émile Scharwath was the most successful of these, gaining seven caps in 1932.
- From 1932 to 1950 Strasbourg native and former club player Ivo Schricker served as Secretary-General of FIFA, football's worldwide governing body.
