= Roland Geldner =

Swiss businessman (1870–1905)

Personal information
- Full name: Carl Maria 'Roland' Geldner
- Date of birth: 23 May 1870
- Place of birth: Switzerland
- Date of death: 1905
- Position: Striker

Senior career*
Years	Team	Apps	(Gls)
1893–1898	FC Basel	(Note: League: up until 1898 there was no league football in Switzerland.)	
- * Club domestic league appearances and goals

Carl Maria 'Roland' Geldner (23 May 1870 – 1905) was a Swiss businessman and founding member of FC Basel. He was the club's first chairman. Geldner was a well-known personality in the city and a long-time player with the first team from the early days of football. He was a distinguished person and was regarded as the soul of the club in the early years.

== Football career ==
Geldner was a member of the Basel rowing club and during a visit to England with his younger brothers, Max Geldner and Georges Geldner, had seen the new football game. The brothers placed an advertisement in the 12 November 1893 edition of the Basler national newspaper, requesting that a football team be formed and that anyone who wished to join should meet up the following Wednesday at 8:15 in the restaurant Schuhmachern-Zunft. Eleven men attended the meeting, generally from the academic community, founding Football Club Basel on 15 November 1893.

Geldner can be considered the club’s first patron and sponsor. Before the club was formed, he reached an agreement with the landowner, Ms Katharina Ehrler-Wittich, about the Landhof. She had just taken over the land from the heirs of Andreas Merian-Iselin, a member of the Merian family. Straight after the club's foundation, she made the Landhof available, free of charge for the first few years, as a playing surface. Geldner himself owned an adjacent plot of land and the team were able to use this for their training sessions. At the very first meeting Geldner gave the club two brand new footballs. At the club’s second meeting he was elected as the club's first chairman.

Geldner trained with the team and the club's first football match was held on 10 December against the football team of the club RTV/Realschüler-Turnverein, a secondary school student gymnastics club. Geldner and both his brothers played in this match, which FCB won two goals to nil. Teammate Charles Volderauer, as a businessman, had good connections and used them from the very beginning. As early as June 1894, he organised the journey to visit Strassburger FV. Geldner was with the group that travelled and played in the match, which ended in a 0–8 defeat.

On 21 October 1894 Basel played their first game in Zürich, against Grasshopper Club Zürich. This was very positively commented on by GC in the local newspaper: "They really deserve credit for daring to travel so far, despite their short existence. Our colleagues in Basel have the same principles as we do. They believe that one can only learn the game properly by playing many matches and possibly suffering defeats. Therefore, we express our highest appreciation for the young club, who have to make significant sacrifices in order to achieve this aim." Despite all expressions of respect, the game on the swamp-like Zurich pitch ended with a 0–4 defeat for Basel. After a heated battle between the two teams, the guests were entertained and then accompanied by the hosts to an evening drink and finally to the train station. Because of this, the FCB players looked forward to the return match against GC two weeks later. Over a dozen members gathered at the train station in Basel to accompany the guests through the city and to have a "morning pint" before the match. The spectators were shown an attractive game, which FCB only lost 0–3; they had improved since the first leg. It was noteworthy that Basel put the ball in the opponents’ goal twice before half time, but both goals were scored from an offside position. Geldner played in both matches. In Basel, as in Zürich two weeks earlier, they treated themselves to a dinner after the game and the opponents were also accompanied back to the train station.

Geldner scored his first goal for his club in the home game on 19 May 1995. In fact he scored two goals as Basel won 6–0 against newly-founded local rivals FC Old Boys Basel. Geldner stayed in the team until the 1897–98 season. He played his last game for the club on 7 November 1897 as Basel were defeated 7–0 by Grasshopper Club.

Between 1893 and 1898 Geldner played a total of 23 games for Basel, scoring at least those two goals. (Note: Scorers: many pre-First World War game sheets no longer exist or are incomplete and, as such, many line-ups and most goalscorers from this period remain unknown.)

Geldner died in 1905 while on a tour in the Swiss Alps.

== Sources ==
- Rotblau: Jahrbuch Saison 2017/2018. Publisher: FC Basel Marketing AG. ISBN 978-3-7245-2189-1
- Die ersten 125 Jahre. Publisher: Josef Zindel im Friedrich Reinhardt Verlag, Basel. ISBN 978-3-7245-2305-5
- Verein "Basler Fussballarchiv" Homepage

(NB: Despite their best efforts, the editors of these books and the authors in "Basler Fussballarchiv" have failed to be able to identify all the players, including their date and place of birth or date and place of death, who played in the games during the early years of FC Basel)
