= List of FC Basel players =

FC Basel 1893 (Fussball Club Basel 1893) is a Swiss football club based in Basel, Switzerland. This is a list of footballers who have played for FC Basel since the club was first founded.

For a list of FC Basel players with a Wikipedia article see Category:FC Basel players. For the current squad see the main FC Basel article or the current 2022–23 season.

The club Fussball Club Basel was founded on 15 November 1893. The club colours from the first day on were red and blue. FC Basel's first game was on 26 November 1893 against itself, an internal match between two ad hoc formed FCB teams against each other. Two weeks later FCB had their first official appearance, in a game against a team formed by students from the high school gymnastic club. FCB won 2–0. In the early days, the club's team played only friendly matches, for example the local derby against BSC Old Boys (founded as FC Old Boys Basel in 1894) and also against Grasshopper Club Zurich (founded in 1886). Basel did not compete in the first (unofficial) Swiss football championship which was held 1897–1898. However, they did contest in the second Serie A championship 1898–1899 which was organized by the Swiss Football Association.

== Legend ==
Table headers

- Nationality – If a player played international football, the country/countries he played for are shown. Otherwise, the player's nationality is given as their country of birth.
- Life – Date of birth and date of death (if known).
- Position – Key to positions is shown below the list.
- Basel career – The year of the player's first appearance for FC Basel and the year of his last appearance.
- League appearances and goals – Appearances and goals are for first-team Swiss League matches only. Substitute appearances are included.
- All appearances and goals – All appearances and goals, including League, Cup and European competition (all games recognised by the UEFA, these being: Champions League, Europa League, Conference League, UEFA Cup, Cup Winners' Cup, Intertoto Cup, Inter-Cities Fairs Cup, Rappen-Cup or Alpencup) but not so called friendly or test games.

NB: Players who are still active for FC Basel are marked in grey.

== List of players ==
Name	Nationality	Life	Position	Basel career	League Appearances	League Goals	All Appearances	All Goals
Emil Abderhalden	(Switzerland)	* 9 March 1877 † 5 August 1950		1893-1895				
Max Born	(Switzerland)	* 21 December 1871 † unknown		1893-1895				
F. H. de Boer	(Netherlands)	* unknown † unknown		1893-1895				
Josy Ebinger	(Switzerland)	* 26 March 1877 † 18 September 1955	CB / CM	1893-1902	0			
Georges Geldner	(Switzerland)	* 7 July 1872 † unknown		1893-1894				
Max Geldner	(Switzerland)	* 25 March 1875 † unknown	CM / ST	1893-1895				
Roland Geldner	(Switzerland)	* 23 May 1870 † 1905	ST	1893-1898				
Wilhelm Glaser	(Switzerland)	* 6 December 1887 † 31 May 1946	CB / ST	1893-1898				
Lewis Gough	(Switzerland)	* 18 March 1876 † unknown		1893-1894				
Jean Grieder	(Switzerland)	* 28 March 1874 † 1941	CM	1893-1894				
Carl Albert Hintermann	(Switzerland)	* 2 November 1876 † 1945	CB / CM	1893-1896				
Ferdinand Isler	(Switzerland)	* 26 December 1866 † 14 December 1951	CB	1893-1896				
Fritz Schäublin	(Switzerland)	* 1 February 1867 † 1951	CM / ST	1893-1895				
Emanuel Schiess	(Switzerland)	* 6 July 1875 † 13 May 1948	ST	1893-1902	17	4	17	4
D. Schoch	(Switzerland)	* unknown † unknown		1893-1894				
H. Siegrist	(Switzerland)	* 1869 † unknown		1893-1896				
Richard Strub	(Switzerland)	* 2 November 1874 † unknown		1893-1894				
John Tollmann	(Switzerland)	* 29 June 1863 † 1924	GK	1893-1898				
Charles Volderauer	(Switzerland)	* 30 May 1871 † 6 October 1931	CB	1893-1899	0			
Otto Bossart	(Switzerland)	* 26 October 1876 † unknown	CB	1894-1896				
K. Ehmann	(Germany)	* unknown † unknown		1894-1895				
Wilhelm Götz	(Switzerland)	* unknown † unknown		1894-1896				
Christian Heyd	(Switzerland)	* 20 December 1878 † unknown		1894-1896				
F. Moormann	(Switzerland)	* unknown † unknown		1894-1895				
Hans Müry	(Switzerland)	* unknown † unknown		1894-1895				
Heinrich Preiswerk	(Switzerland)	* 9 May 1876 † unknown		1894-1896				
Adolf Rittmann	(Switzerland)	* 8 June 1876 † 1918	GK / ST	1894-1899	2	0	2	0
S. A. de Clerk		* unknown † unknown	ST	1895-1896				
Henry Devick		* 1882 † 1949		1895-1896				
Joan Gamper	(Switzerland)	* 22 November 1877 † 30 July 1930		1895-1897				
Hans Koch	(Switzerland)	* unknown † unknown		1895-1896				
Albert Linder	(Switzerland)	* 8 November 1877 † unknown	CM	1895-1898				
J. Schneider	(Switzerland)	* 4 January 1877 † unknown	ST	1895-1896				
Erwin Schricker	(Germany)	* 22 August 1878 † 20 October 1914	CB	1895-1896				
Ivo Schricker	(Germany)	* 18 March 1877 † 10 January 1962	CB / ST	1895-1896				
Fr. Stauber	(Switzerland)	* unknown † unknown		1895-1896				
R. C. Vanorden		* unknown † unknown		1895-1897				
Rudolf Bax	(Switzerland) (England)	* 24 November 1878 † unknown		1896-1897				
Alfred Devick		* 29 June 1881 † 1932		1896-1898				
Fritz Gürtler	(Switzerland)	* unknown † unknown		1896-1897				
Louis Gürtler	(Switzerland)	* 22 May 1879 † unknown		1896-1899	0			
Rudolf Iselin	(Switzerland)	* unknown † unknown	CM	1896-1899	2	0	2	0
Eric Mory	(Switzerland)	* 17 April 1879 † unknown	CM / ST	1896-1898				
Paul Preiswerk	(Switzerland)	* 7 September 1879 † unknown		1896-1897				
Hermann Schneider	(Switzerland)	* 4 January 1877 † unknown	ST	1896-1901	7	1	7	1
Gustav Schwarz	(Switzerland)	* unknown † unknown		1896-1897				
R. Sommer	(Switzerland)	* 11 March 1880 † unknown	CM / ST	1896-1900	1	0	1	0
Hans Billeter	(Switzerland)	* unknown † unknown	ST	1897-1900	2	0	2	0
Georges Fürstenberger	(Switzerland)	* 1881 † 1941	CM	1897-1900	1	0	1	0
Ernst Gass	(Switzerland)	* 27 April 1883 † unknown	CM	1897-1900	2	0	2	0
Rudolf La Roche	(Switzerland)	* 1 October 1880 † unknown	CM	1897-1900	1	0	1	0
Hermann Matzinger	(Switzerland)	* 17 February 1882 † unknown		1897-1898				
Otto Reber	(Switzerland)	* unknown † unknown	CM	1897-1900	2	0	2	0
Rudolf Schwarz	(Switzerland)	* 30 May 1881 † unknown	CM	1897-1900	0			
Ernst-Alfred Thalmann	(Switzerland)	* 8 April 1881 † 23 September 1938	CM	1897-1908	58	11	58	11
Roland Ziegler	(Switzerland)	* 8 July 1882 † unknown		1897-1899	0			
Walter Zürrer	(Switzerland)	* 8 June 1879 † 1955		1897-1898				
Paul Hofer	(Switzerland)	* 7 September 1881 † unknown	GK / CB	1898-1905	27	0	27	0
Alfred Iselin	(Switzerland)	* unknown † unknown		1898-1899	0			
L. Montbaron	(Switzerland)	* unknown † unknown		1898-1899	1	0	1	0
Edmond Racle	(Switzerland)	* 30 September 1880 † unknown		1898-1901	1	0	1	0
Karl Schneider (Schneider II)	(Switzerland)	* unknown † unknown		1898-1901	7	0	7	0
Horace Watts		* unknown † unknown		1898-1899	0			
Jules Fingerlin	(Switzerland)	* 30 September 1881 † 28 December 1929	GK/CB	1899-1907	15	0	15	0
Jules Gérard	(France)	* unknown † unknown	CM	1899-1901	3	0	3	0
Rudolf Gossweiler	(Switzerland)	* 8 January 1882 † unknown	CM / ST	1899–1904; 1908-1910	21	1	21	1
Daniel Hug	(Switzerland)	* 19 September 1884 † 28 November 1918	CM	1899-1908	56	8	56	8
Albert Sevin	(Switzerland)	* unknown † unknown		1899-1900				
Dr. Siegfried Pfeiffer	(Switzerland)	* 19 October 1883 † 5 February 1959	CM	1899-1919	32	16	32	16
Alphonse Schorpp	(Switzerland)	* 5 January 1881 † unknown	CM	1899-1903	24	3	24	3
Paul Thalmann (Thalmann III)	(Switzerland)	* 16 October 1884 † unknown	CM / ST	1899-1904	7+	0	7+	0
Max Zutt	(Switzerland)	* 17 August 1880 † unknown		1899-1900				
Andre Burnier (Burnier II)	(Switzerland)	* unknown † unknown	CM / ST	1900-1901	4	0	4	0
Gustave Burnier (Burnier I)	(Switzerland)	* unknown † unknown	CM / ST	1900-1901	5	0	5	0
Giulio Cederna	(Italy)	* 5 February 1876 † 24 December 1939	GK	1900-1901	2	0	2	0
L. B. Trenchard Chaffey	(England)	* 21 September 1875; 13 January 1941		1900-1901	2	1	2	1
Archibald E. Gough	(England)	* 16 March 1883 † unknown	MF	1900-1902	4	0	4	0
G. Gürtler	(Switzerland)	* 3 March 1882 † unknown		1900-1901	2	0	2	0
Emil Hasler	(Switzerland)	* 29 July 1883 † 7 December 1932	MF	1900-1921	85	45	85	45
Heinrichs		* unknown † unknown		1900-1902	6	0	6	0
Rudolf Landerer	(Switzerland)	* 7 September 1878 † unknown	CM / ST	1900-1903	14	5	14	5
Eduard Laubi	(Switzerland)	* unknown † unknown	CM / ST	1900-1904	19	3	19	3
P. Lozéron		* unknown † unknown		1900-1904	5	0	5	0
Alois Magnin	(Switzerland)	* 18 May 1882 † 1965		1900-1901	1	0	1	0
Mislan		* unknown † unknown		1900-1901	1	0	1	0
Ami Pflüger		* unknown † unknown		1900-1901	2	0	2	0
Hans Rietmann	(Switzerland)	* unknown † unknown		1900-1904	1+	0	1+	0
Hans Riggenbach (Riggenbach II)	(Switzerland)	* unknown † unknown	CB	1900-1903	14	0	14	0
Fritz Schweizer	(Switzerland)	* unknown † unknown	CM	1900-1902	13	0	13	0
Clarasso		* unknown † unknown		1901-1903	5	0	5	0
Henry Gürtler	(Switzerland)	* 13 February 1888 † unknown	CM	1901-1902	2	0	2	0
Edwin Kaufmann (Kaufmann II)		* unknown † unknown		1901-1905	1	1	1	1
Paul Nosch		* unknown † unknown		1901-1904	3	0	3	0
Adolf Ramseyer	(Switzerland)	* 1883 † * unknown	CB	1901-1908	40+	1	40+	1
Georges Sauser		* unknown † unknown		1901-1902	1	0	1	0
Eugen Stutz (Stutz I)	(Switzerland)	* unknown † unknown	GK	1901-1905	5+	0	5+	0
Werner Stutz (Stutz II)	(Switzerland)	* 31 March 1883 † unknown	CM / ST	1901-1904	7	0	7	0
Karl Gossweiler	(Switzerland)	* unknown † unknown	ST	1902-1907	25+	17	25+	17
Percy Kaufmann (Kaufmann I)	(Switzerland)	* unknown † unknown	CM / ST	1902-1904	17+	1	17+	1
Albert Klein	(Switzerland)	* 9 May 1881 † unknown		1902-1904	2	0	2	0
Lee		* unknown † unknown		1902-1903	1	0	1	0
Eugen Strauss	(Switzerland)	* 4 February 1881 † unknown		1902-1904	22	0	22	0
Paul Egli	(Switzerland)	* unknown † unknown		1903-1904	1	0	1	0
Artur Viehoff		* 14 December 1885 † unknown		1903-1904	4	0	4	0
Manuel Bourgeois		* unknown † unknown	ST	1904-1907	8+	0	8+	0
Pierre Chevalley	(Switzerland)	* unknown † unknown	GK / ST	1904-1907	8+	1	8+	1
Fritz Runkel		* unknown † unknown		1904-1905	1	0	1	0
Heinrich Schiess		* unknown † unknown		1904-1905	1	0	1	0
P. Vaney		* unknown † unknown	CM	1904-1907	5	0	5	0
Emil Vogt		* unknown † 1967		1904-1909	3	0	3	0
Josef Goldschmidt	(Germany)	* unknown † unknown	CM	1905-1914	56	1	58	1
Edmond Bédat		* unknown † unknown		1905-1907	1	0	1	0
Feissly		* unknown † unknown		1905-1906	1	0	1	0
A. Guignard		* unknown † unknown		1905-1906	1	0	1	0
Oskar Zwimpfer	(Switzerland)	* unknown † unknown	CM	1905-1906	2+	0	2+	0
Max Palatini	(Switzerland)	* unknown † unknown	MF	1906-1912	19	0	19	0
Ernesto Persenico	(Switzerland)	* 21 November 1888 † unknown	GK / MF	1906-1909	8	0	8	0
Luigi Persenico	(Switzerland)	* 28 July 1889 † unknown	MF	1906-1910	5	0	5	0
Max Senn	(Switzerland)	* 11 February 1883 † 21 July 1933	ST	1906-1908	22	10	22	10
Alfred Stöhrmann	(Germany)	* 1882 † 4 September 1914	ST	1906-1908	7	5	7	5
Christian Albicker (Albicker I)	(Switzerland)	* 5 January 1892 † 22 September 1934	ST	1907-1920	70	41	70	41
Ernst Gossweiler	(Switzerland)	* unknown † unknown	MF	1907-1915	28	2	28	2
Fridolin Wenger	(Switzerland)	* unknown † 1931	GK / CM	1907-1914	45	3	45	3
Ernst Amstein	(Switzerland)	* 22 July 1889 † unknown	CD	1908-1910	6+	0	6+	0
Eduard Bauer	(Switzerland)	* unknown † unknown	CM	1908-1909	1	0	1	0
Rudolf Bredschneider		* unknown † unknown	ST	1908-1919	48	6	48	6
Werner Keller	(Switzerland)	* unknown † unknown	ST	1908-1909	5+	3	5+	3
H. Légeret		* unknown † unknown	CM / ST	1908-1909	5+	3	5+	3
Albert Meyer	(Switzerland)	* unknown † unknown	GK	1908-1911	15	0	15	0
Hermann Moll	(Switzerland)	* 16 April 1891 † unknown	MF	1908-1927	82	4	82	4
Albicker	(Switzerland)	* unknown † unknown		1909-1910	4	0	4	0
Wilhelm Geisser	(Switzerland)	* 1889 † 11 February 1964	CM	1909-1923	68	0	68	0
Paul Gürtler	(Switzerland)	* 16 July 1991 † unknown	CM	1909-1910	5+	0	5+	0
Dr. phil Ernst Kaltenbach	(Switzerland)	* 7 February 1889 † 10 October 1965	CM	1909-1927	68	5	68	5
Karl Wunderle	(Switzerland)	* unknown † unknown	MF / ST	1909-1916	54	13	54	13
Fritz Albicker	(Switzerland)	* 1893 † 15 October 1959	MF	1910-1917	8	0	8	0
Karl Ibach	(Switzerland)	* 1892 † 22 February 1953	ST	1910-1922	6	0	6	0
Birger Persson	(Sweden)	* 1892 † unknown	ST	1910-1912	1	0	1	0
Riesterer	(Switzerland)	* unknown † unknown		1910-1913	21	1	21	1
A.H. Würgler	(Switzerland)	* unknown † unknown	GK	1910-1912	2+	0	2+	0
Max Bauer	(Switzerland)	* 12 February 1893 † unknown	CM	1911-1912	2+	0	2+	0
Ernst Buss	(Switzerland)	* 5 November 1892 † 3 September 1950	ST	1911-1916	1	1	1	1
E. Friedli	(Switzerland)	* unknown † unknown	ST	1911-1912	3+	1	3+	1
Jakob Känzig	(Switzerland)	* 7 May 1893 † unknown	MF / FW	1911-1922	48	0	48	0
Otto Kuhn	(Switzerland)	* 9 June 1896 † 29 June 1953	CM	1911-1924	107	41	107	41
Rupprecht		* unknown † unknown		1911-1912	2	0	2	0
K. Sandmann		* unknown † unknown	GK	1911-1912	1	0	1	0
Paul Bettex	(Switzerland)	* 29 July 1892 † 6 June 1942	CB	1912-1918	19	0	19	0
Roger Breithaupt	(Switzerland)	* unknown † unknown	MF	1912-1916	13	0	13	0
Hans Kramer	(Switzerland)	* unknown † unknown		1912-1916	1	0	1	0
Emil Schreyer	(Switzerland)	* unknown † 6 August 1916	MF / ST	1912-1915	28	11	28	11
P. Vietti		* unknown † 1917	GK	1912-1913	12	0	12	0
Fritz Aeppli	(Switzerland)	* unknown † unknown	ST	1913-1916	17	6	17	6
Emil Fehr	(Switzerland)	* unknown † unknown	GK	1913-1919	5	0	5	0
Walter Flück	(Switzerland)	* unknown † unknown	CB / MF	1913-1919	1	0	1	0
Max Glenck	(Switzerland)	* 7 December 1889 † unknown	GK / MF	1913-1914	2	0	2	0
Peter Riesterer	(Switzerland)	* 10 September 1892 † unknown	LB	1913-1930	146	6	244	9
Carl Schloz	(Switzerland)	* unknown † unknown	MF / ST	1913-1920	30	1	45	4
Ernst Bickel	(Switzerland)	* unknown † unknown	MF / ST	1914-1918	4	0	4	0
Borer		* unknown † unknown		1914-1918	2	0	2	0
Arthur Fahr	(Switzerland)	* 1898 † 9 May 1968	GK	1914-1927	112	0	112	0
Philipp Leichner	(Switzerland)	* unknown † unknown	MF	1914-1915	1	0	1	0
Rud. Steffen		* unknown † unknown		1914-1915	1	0	1	0
Ernst Danzeisen		* unknown † unknown		1915-1916	4	0	4	0
Willy Danzeisen		* unknown † unknown		1915-1916	1	0	1	0
Ganter Ganter (I)		* unknown † unknown	CM	1915-1920	2	0	2	0
Fritz Raas	(Switzerland)	* 31 January 1895 † unknown	MF / ST	1915-1921	11	0	11	0
Louis Riesterer	(Switzerland)	* unknown † unknown	ST	1915-1920	2	0	2	0
Anton Rittel Rittel (I)	(Switzerland)	* unknown † unknown	CB / MF	1915-1919	10	0	10	0
Ernst Rittel Rittel (II)	(Switzerland)	* unknown † unknown	MF / ST	1915-1918	5	0	5	0
Walter Rupprecht	(Switzerland)	* unknown † 21 July 1954	CB	1915-1921	5	0	5	0
Karl Wüthrich	(Switzerland)	* unknown † unknown	ST	1915-1929	112	50	112	50
Karl Bielser	(Switzerland)	* 1903 † unknown	ST	1916-1933	241	93	323	55
Forster	(Switzerland)	* unknown † unknown	CM	1916-1917	1	0	1	0
Emil Ganter	(Switzerland)	* 20 January 1892 † unknown	CB / MF	1916-1919	19	4	19	4
Oscar Kohler	(Switzerland)	* unknown † unknown		1916-1917	1	0	1	0
Jules Lotter	(Switzerland)	* unknown † unknown	MF	1916-1918	2	1	2	1
Valentin von der Mühll		* 1884 † 1929	MF / ST	1916-1918	4	1	5	1
Charles Bouwmeester		* unknown † unknown	MF	1917-1918	4	0	4	0
Gustav Buser		* unknown † unknown	ST	1917-1920	12	2	12	2
Wilhelm Dietz (Dietz I)	(Switzerland)	* unknown † 3 April 1920	ST	1917-1920	25	7	25	7
Roose		* unknown † unknown		1917-1918	1	0	1	0
Karl Rudin	(Switzerland)	* unknown † unknown	ST	1917-1921	14	3	14	3
Albert Buser		* unknown † unknown		1918-1919	9	1	9	1
Karl Kroepfli	(Switzerland)	* unknown † unknown	CB	1918-1921	11	0	11	0
Karl Lott	(Switzerland)	* 9 September 1901 † 26 August 1922	ST	1918-1921	13	1	13	1
Ernst Zorzotti	(Switzerland)	* 18 July 1900 † 12 March 1970	GK	1918–1922; 1923-1931	113	3	124	3
Walter Birbaum	(Switzerland)	* unknown † unknown	GK	1919-1920	3	0	3	0
Walter Dietrich	(Switzerland)	* 24 December 1902 † 27 November 1979		1919-1922	8	1	8	1
Paul Dietz (Dietz II)	(Switzerland)	* unknown † unknown		1919-1924	28	6	28	6
Jules Düblin	(Switzerland)	* 30 August 1895 †1992		1919-1926	27	4	27	4
Fritz Grüssi	(Switzerland)	* unknown † unknown	CB	1919-1920	8	0	8	0
Freidrich Lott	(Switzerland)	* unknown † unknown		1919-1920	1	0	1	0
Gustav Putzendopler (Putzendopler I)	(Austria)	* 16 January 1894 † 20 November 1969	CB	1919-1927	95	3	98	3
Karl Putzendopler (Putzendopler II)	(Austria)	* 1898 † 11 January 1983	CM	1919-1927	79	5	82	5
Fritz Bucco	(Switzerland)	* unknown † unknown	ST	1920-1922	3	1	3	1
Walter Galler	(Switzerland)	* 17 June 1899 † 10 October 1952	CM	1920-1921	2	0	2	0
Willy Geiser	(Switzerland)	* 15 November 1903 † unknown	CM	1920-1923	20	0	20	0
Alfréd Schaffer	(Hungary)	* 13 February 1893 † 30 August 1945	ST	1920-1921	1	0	1	0
Bürgin		* unknown † unknown		1921-1925	1	0	1	0
Wilhelm Flubacher (Flubacher I)	(Switzerland)	* unknown † unknown		1921-1924	2	0	2	0
Max Galler	(Switzerland)	* 27 January 1902 † 6 January 1970	CM	1921-1932	140	2	143	3
Max Gailer	(Switzerland)	* unknown † unknown		1921-1923	1	0	1	0
Gottlieb Häusselmann	(Switzerland)	* unknown † unknown	FW	1921-1924	2	0	2	0
Hans Schneider	(Switzerland)	* unknown † unknown	ST	1921-1924	15	1	15	1
Franz Zeiser	(Switzerland)	* unknown † unknown	ST	1921-1925	26	1	27	1
Hasler	(Switzerland)	* unknown † unknown	CB	1922-1923	1	0	1	0
Gaetano Dal Ben	(Switzerland)	* unknown † unknown	ST	1922-1923	1	0	1	0
Hans Rau	(Switzerland)	* unknown † unknown	ST	1922-1928	22	4	23	4
Theodor Schär	(Switzerland)	* 16 February 1903 † unknown	GK	1922-1925	46	0	46	0
Alfred Schlecht	(Switzerland)	* 11 June 1903 † 14 January 1986	ST	1922–1924; 1925-1936	136	74	153	84
Fritz Schneider	(Switzerland)	* unknown † unknown	ST	1922-1924	13	1	13	1
Karl Wangler	(Switzerland)	* unknown † unknown	CM	1922-1926	1	0	2	0
Eugen Haas	(Switzerland)	* unknown † unknown	FW	1923-1924	12	0	12	0
Heinrich Hess	(Switzerland)	* unknown † unknown	ST	1923-1925	20	2	20	2
Paul Nebiker	(Switzerland)	* unknown † 18 March 1928	ST	1923-1927	4	0	4	0
Hans Vogt	(Switzerland)	* unknown † unknown	MF	1923-1924	2	0	2	0
Curt Wellauer	(Switzerland)	* unknown † unknown	ST	1923-1926	0	0	1	0
Arnold Wyssling	(Switzerland)	* unknown † unknown	GK	1923-1926	2	0	2	0
Emil Breh	(Switzerland)	* unknown † unknown	ST	1924-1925	15	7	15	7
Fritz Eichenberger		* unknown † unknown		1924-1925	3	0	3	0
Hugo Flubacher (Flubacher II)	(Switzerland)	* 8 August 1899 † 7 October 1967	CM	1924-1929	2	0	2	0
Georg Heimann	(Switzerland)	* 29 May 1905 † 1980	MF	1924-1929	11	0	12	0
Gustav Isler		* unknown † unknown		1924-1925	1	0	1	0
Max Strasser	(Switzerland)	* 23 May 1904 † 16 November 1967	ST	1924-1930	52	4	57	8
August von Arx	(Switzerland)	* unknown † unknown	ST	1924-1926	2	0	2	0
Armando Ardizzoia	(Switzerland)	* 1907 † 20 October 1968	CB	1925-1933	60	1	66	1
Fritz Bölle	(Switzerland)	* unknown † unknown	ST	1925-1927	5	1	6	1
Alfred Heidig	(Switzerland)	* unknown † 29 September 1985	LB	1925-1930	11	0	14	0
Arnold Hürzeler	(Switzerland)	* unknown † unknown	ST	1925-1926	15	8	17	15
Ernst Nyffeler	(Switzerland)	* unknown † unknown		1925-1926	1	0	1	0
Jacques Steiner	(Switzerland)	* 1903 † 17 December 1968	MF	1925-1927	4	0	4	0
Emil Arlt	(Switzerland)	* unknown † unknown	ST	1926-1928	19	14	21	14
Louis Blindenbacher	(Switzerland)	* unknown † unknown	CM	1926-1927	1	0	1	0
François Comte	(Switzerland)	* unknown † unknown	ST	1926-1927	1	0	1	0
Ernst Christ	(Switzerland)	* unknown † unknown	GK	1926-1928	12	0	12	0
Alfred Enderlin	(Germany) (Switzerland)	* unknown † unknown	ST	1926-1934	85	39	98	50
Hermann Enderlin	(Germany) (Switzerland)	* 24 September 1906 † 18 May 1973	CB	1926-1935	109	0	121	0
Max Lehmann	(France) (Switzerland)	* 17 December 1906 † 18 April 2009	ST	1926-1928	15	0	16	0
Otto Meier	(Switzerland)	* unknown † 1967	MF	1926-1931	52	2	61	2
Max Oswald	(Switzerland)	* unknown † unknown	ST	1926-1929	11	3	12	3
Paul Schaub	(Switzerland)	* 1907 † unknown	MF	1926-1937	179	9	283	11
Hans Streng	(Switzerland)	* unknown † unknown	ST	1926-1928	7	0	7	0
Jakob Bürgin	(Switzerland)	* unknown † unknown	LB	1927-1928	2	0	3	0
Fritz Gerster	(Switzerland)	* unknown † unknown	ST	1927-1928	2	0	2	0
Gustav Vogt	(Switzerland)	* unknown † unknown		1927-1928	2	0	2	0
Traugott Märki	(Switzerland)	* unknown † unknown	GK	1928-1939	1	0	1	0
Walter Müller	(Switzerland)	* 14 December 1910 † unknown	ST	1928–1930; 1932-1936	121	36	149	53
Eugen Schmid		* unknown † unknown		1928-1929	1	0	1	0
Ernst Weber	(Switzerland)	* 16 December 1902 † 21 February 1991	CB	1928-1932	20	0	24	0
Stefan Grünfeld	(Switzerland)	* unknown † unknown	GK	1929-1930	1	0	1	0
Ernst Hufschmid	(Switzerland)	* 4 February 1913 † 30 November 2001	CB / MF	1929-1950	268	51	322	62
Walter Notz	(Switzerland)	* unknown † unknown	MF	1929-1931	6	1	6	1
Emil Riedener	(Switzerland)	* unknown † unknown	MF	1929-1931	5	0	6	0
Leopold Wionsowsky	(Poland)	* unknown † unknown	ST	1929-1932	30	7	37	13
Hector Fisher	(Switzerland) (England)	* 4 May 1901 † unknown		1930-1931	1	0	1	0
Ernst Grauer	(Switzerland)	* 1913 † May 2006	CB	1930–1933; 1935-1948	234	7	274	9
Fritz Griesbaum	(Switzerland)	* unknown † unknown		1930-1931	0	0	1	0
Alfred Jaeck	(Switzerland)	* 2 August 1911 † 28 August 1953	ST	1930–1936; 1938-1941	149	61	170	73
Jørgen Juve	(Norway)	* 22 November 1906 † 12 April 1983	ST	1930-1931	12	10	12	10
Leopold Kielholz	(Switzerland)	* 9 June 1911 † 4 June 1980	ST	1930-1932	34	23	39	27
Hans Nikles	(Switzerland)	* unknown † unknown	GK	1930-1931	17	0	18	0
Paul Blumer	(Switzerland)	* unknown † unknown	GK	1931-1939	8	0	11	0
Eduard Buser	(Switzerland)	* 25 February 1913 † unknown	ST	1931-1939	32	14	34	14
Vlastimil Borecký	(Czech Republic)	* 1 June 1907 † unknown	CB / MF	1931-1934	40	2	52	2
Adolf Frey	(Switzerland)	* unknown † unknown	ST	1931-1934	4	1	4	1
Otto Haftl	(Austria)	* 1903 † unknown	ST	1931-1935	88	75	144	130
August Hiss	(Switzerland)	* unknown † unknown	ST	1931-1932	9	3	12	6
Emil Hummel	(Germany)	* 1911 † unknown	CM	1931-1938	114	11	142	16
Klemm	(Czech Republic)	* unknown † unknown	GK	1931-1932	2	0	3	0
Josef Kratochvíl	(Czech Republic)	* 9 February 1905 † 8 July 1984	ST	1931-1932	1	0	1	0
Giovanni Lupi	(Switzerland)	* 14 December 1908 † unknown	MF	1931-1932	3	0	3	0
Ferenc Plattkó	(Hungary)	* 2 December 1898 † 2 September 1983	GK	1931-1932	5	0	6	0
Josef Remay	(Hungary)	* 1 January 1903 † 2 November 1945	CM	1931-1932	3	0	5	0
Gerhard Walter	(Switzerland)	* unknown † unknown	GK	1931-1933	6	0	8	0
Emil Blattmann	(Switzerland)	* unknown † unknown	GK	1932-1934	4	0	4	0
Josef Chloupek	(Austria)	* 22 April 1908 † 11 January 1974	ST	1932-1934	18	0	20	0
Kurt Imhof	(Switzerland)	* 1914 † unknown	GK	1932–1935; 1938-1947	90	0	106	0
Paul Heinrich		* unknown † unknown		1932-1933	0	0	1	0
Ferdinand Wesely	(Austria)	* 30 May 1897 † 19 March 1949	ST	1932-1934	41	19	50	25
Robert Büchi	(Switzerland)	* 1909 † unknown	CB	1933-1939	72	1	78	1
Hans Greiner	(Switzerland)	* 1912 † unknown	CB	1933-1936	59	2	69	2
Machow		* unknown † unknown		1933-1934	1	0	1	0
Mutter	(Switzerland)	* unknown † unknown		1933-1934	2	0	3	0
Eduard Zuber	(Switzerland)	* 22 July 1914 † 1990	CM	1933-1939	56	2	60	2
Enrico Ardizzoia	(Switzerland)	* 29 June 1917 † unknown	ST	1934-1942	4	0	4	0
Heinrich Diethelm	(Switzerland)	* 1915 † unknown	CM	1934-1939	19	3	19	3
Willy Hufschmid	(Switzerland)	* unknown † unknown	GK	1935-1936	1	0	1	0
Caspar Monigatti	(Switzerland)	* 1913 † unknown	CM	1934-1938	52	0	58	0
Fritz Schmidlin	(Switzerland)	* 30 November 1914 † unknown	CM	1934-1945	173	32	191	40
Federico Schott	(Switzerland)	* 1910 † unknown	ST	1934-1936	10	4	11	4
Ferdinand Spichiger	(Switzerland)	* 1909 † unknown	CM	1934-1937	12	3	14	3
Josef Artimovicz	(Austria)	* 7 January 1909 † 11 April 1988	ST	1935-1937	26	14	28	14
Hugo Burkhardt	(Switzerland)	* 1910 † unknown	GK	1935-1936	8	0	9	0
Eugène de Kalbermatten	(Switzerland)	* 1914 † 1983	GK	1935-1939	66	0	72	0
Heinz Elsässer	(Switzerland)	* 11 March 1917 † unknown	CB	1935-1947	154	2	170	2
August Ibach	(Switzerland)	* 1918 † 26 August 1988	CM	1935-1941	79	47	87	52
Fernand Jaccard	(Switzerland)	* 8 October 1907 † 15 April 2008	CM	1935-1939	62	4	68	4
Noll	(Switzerland)	* unknown † unknown	ST	1935-1936	1	0	1	0
Alwin Riemke	(West Germany)	* 2. Februar 1910 † November 1991	GK	1935-1936	4	0	4	0
Walter Schmidlin	(Switzerland)	* unknown † unknown	CM	1935-1940	3	0	3	0
Guglielmo Spadini	(Switzerland)	* 25 October 1911 † unknown	CM/ST	1935-1946	110	23	125	23
Ludwig Stroh	(Austria)	* 2 February 1910 † unknown	CM	1935-1936	7	0	8	0
Maurice Dubosson	(Switzerland)	* unknown † unknown	ST	1936-1939	9	1	9	1
Louis Favre	(Switzerland)	* unknown † unknown	CB	1936-1946	74	2	94	2
Gottfried Havlicek	(Austria)	* 1. Januar 1910 † unknown	ST	1936-1937	6	0	6	0
Ernst Kipfer	(Switzerland)	* 3. November 1915 † 13 February 2016	GK	1936-1946	9	0	10	0
Othmar Saner	(Switzerland)	* unknown † unknown	CM	1936-1939	34	8	37	9
Alfons Weber	(Switzerland)	* 1 August 1915 † unknown	ST	1936-1938	43	11	47	13
Hans Weber	(Switzerland)	* unknown † unknown	ST	1936-1937	6	0	6	0
Fritz Glaser	(Switzerland)	* unknown >† unknown	GK	1937-1939	1	0	1	0
Numa Monnard	(Switzerland)	* 23 September 1918 † 5 October 2001	ST	1937-1938	21	20	24	28
Franz Sattler	(Germany)	* 1911 † unknown	CM	1937-1939	33	1	35	2
René Schaller	(Switzerland)	* 1915 † unknown	ST	1937-1939	14	5	16	7
Henri Bernard	(Switzerland)	* 10 March 1914 † 3 July 1942	CB	1938-1942	40	1	46	1
Bossoni	(Switzerland)	* unknown	ST	1938-1939	6	0	6	0
Eduard Irniger	(Switzerland)	* unknown	ST	1938-1939	5	0	5	0
Alex Mathys	(Switzerland)	* 1916 † unknown	ST	1938-1942; 1943-1948	39	18	47	19
Albert Mohler	(Switzerland)	* unknown † unknown	CM	1938-1942	4	0	4	0
Walter Zürrer	(Switzerland)	* 7 September 1916 † 1968	ST	1938-1940	3	0	3	0
Max Bosshard	(Switzerland)	* unknown † unknown	ST	1939-1940	4	1	5	1
Henri Brinks	(Switzerland)	* unknown † unknown	ST	1939-1940	4	4	6	4
Karl Doppler		* unknown † unknown		1939-1941	2	0	2	0
Alexander Ebner	(Switzerland)	* unknown † unknown	CM	1939-1947	92	11	102	15
Hauenstein	(Switzerland)	* unknown † unknown	CM	1939-1940	1	0	1	0
Fritz Huggenberger	(Switzerland)	* unknown >† unknown	CM	1939-1940	1	0	2	0
Andreas Kränzlin	(Germany)	* unknown † unknown	CM	1939-1941	16	0	19	0
Werner Kurrus	(Switzerland)	* unknown † unknown	ST	1939-1940	1	0	3	0
Fritz Lanz	(Switzerland)	* unknown † unknown	ST	1939-1940	2	1	2	1
Hans Studer	(Switzerland)	* unknown † unknown	CM	1939-1942	3	0	3	0
Hermann Suter	(Switzerland)	* 17 April 1920 † 22 August 2005	ST	1939-1948	195	79	229	104
Paul Wechlin	(Switzerland)	* 10 February 1920 † 4 July 2013	GK	1939-1949	52	0	59	0
Werner Wenk	(Switzerland)	* 26 October 1922 † 25 March 2017	CM	1939-1952	131	29	157	36
Giuseppe Bossi	(Switzerland)	* 29 August 1911 † unknown	ST	1940-1942	23	3	39	6
Hans Vonthron	(Switzerland)	* unknown † 1989	CM	1940-1948	147	12	182	17
Silvio Cinguetti	(Switzerland)	* 1911 † unknown	GK	1941-1943	34	0	44	0
Erhard Grieder	(Switzerland)	* unknown † unknown	ST	1941-1942	3	8	8	12
Rodolfo Kappenberger	(Switzerland)	* 6 October 1917 † 11 May 2012	ST	1941-1948	100	31	119	37
Rudolf Knup	(Switzerland)	* unknown † unknown	ST	1941-1944	14	1	14	1
Alberto Losa	(Switzerland)	* 1917 † unknown	CM	1941-1945	84	5	99	6
Traugott Oberer	(Switzerland)	* 30 November 1924 † unknown	ST	1941–1942; 1944-1948	92	42	109	53
Eugen Rupf	(Switzerland)	* 1914 † 2000	ST	1941-1943	32	16	41	20
Hans Spengler	(Switzerland)	* unknown † unknown	ST	1941-1943	8	0	8	0
Rudolf Wirz	(Switzerland)	* 1918 † 5 November 1988	CM	1941-1948	51	0	62	0
Erich Andres	(Switzerland)	* 31 July 1920 † 1999	ST	1942-1943	14	5	17	7
Fritz Greder	(Switzerland)	* unknown † unknown	CB	1942-1943	16	0	19	0
Walter Müller	(Switzerland)	* 2 January 1920 † 14 December 2010	GK	1942-1956	249	0	291	0
Talone		* unknown † unknown	ST	1942-1943	1	0	1	0
Karl von Arx	(Switzerland)	* 1921 † 1982	CM	1942-1946	31	1	35	1
Kurt Bertsch	(Switzerland)	* 31 March 1921 † unknown	ST	1943-1946	41	15	49	19
Max Gloor	(Switzerland)	* unknown † unknown	ST	1943-1945	4	2	4	2
Carl Adolf Honegger	(Switzerland)	* unknown † unknown		1943-1944	1	0	1	0
Hans Nyffeler	(Switzerland)	* unknown † unknown	ST	1943-1945	16	1	16	1
Alfred Weisshaar	(Switzerland)	* unknown † unknown	ST	1943-1948	32	17	40	20
Werner Bopp	(Switzerland)	* 12 February 1924 † 22 October 2006	CD	1944-1960	321	13	364	15
Willy Monigatti	(Switzerland)	* unknown † unknown	CM	1944-1949	32	11	36	12
H. Müller	(Switzerland)	* unknown † unknown	GK	1944-1945	1	0	1	0
Willy Zingg	(Switzerland)	* unknown † 1968	CM	1944-1951	6	0	7	0
Kurt Maurer	(Switzerland)	* 1926 † unknown	CM	1945–1949; 1951-1954	107	2	122	2
Werner Martin	(Switzerland)	* 16 September 1928	ST	1945-1946	12	2	13	2
Paul Stöcklin	(Switzerland)	* 29 June 1922 † 19 July 2014	CM	1945-1952	156	61	183	68
René Bader	(Switzerland)	* 7 August 1922 † 6 May 1995	ST	1946-1953	230	91	269	118
Walter Bosshard	(Switzerland)	* 17 January 1921 † unknown	ST	1946-1948	1	0	1	0
Bernard Mathez	(Switzerland)	* unknown † unknown	ST	1946-1948	10	4	11	4
Hans Rothen	(Switzerland)	* unknown † unknown	ST	1946-1947	1	0	1	0
Gottlieb Stäuble	(Switzerland)	* 27. April 1929 † 24. April 2015	ST	1946–1951; 1955-1959	185	81	208	94
Hans-Rudolf Fitze	(Switzerland)	* 3 September 1925 † 13 September 1982	CB	1947-1957	151	1	175	3
Erich Grether	(Switzerland)	* 27 August 1924 † unknown	ST	1947-1951	15	4	15	4
Rudolf Hägler	(Switzerland)	* 24 January 1925 † unknown	ST	1947-1949	5	0	7	1
Hans Hügi (Hügi I)	(Switzerland)	* 29 September 1926 † 1 February 2000	CB	1947-1959	196	37	220	42
Virgilio Muggiasca	(Switzerland)	* 22 January 1925	ST	1947-1948	1	0	1	0
Jean Presset	(Switzerland)	* 11 October 1925 † 22 February 2017	GK	1947-1951	4	0	4	0
Pierre Redolfi	(France)	* 14 January 1923 † 9 February 2019	CM	1947-1958	250	0	284	0
Louis Schenker	(Switzerland)	* 7 February 1917 † unknown	CM	1947-1951	47	1	54	1
Leo Baumgratz	(Switzerland)	* unknown † 1991	CM	1948-1951	16	1	19	2
Josef Hügi (Hügi II)	(Switzerland)	* 23 January 1930 † 16 April 1995	ST	1948-1962	320	244	363	282
Albert Meier	(Switzerland)	* unknown † unknown	ST	1948-1950	2	0	2	0
Kurt Rieder	(Switzerland)	* unknown † unknown		1948-1949	0	0	3	0
Walter Bannwart	(Switzerland)	* 3 March 1927 † unknown	ST	1949-1957	171	44	191	50
René Hebinger	(France)	* 22 June 1921 † 19 August 2008	ST	1949-1950	3	0	3	0
Otto Krieg	(Switzerland)	* unknown † unknown	CM	1949-1950	8	1	10	2
Otto Soltermann	(Switzerland)	* unknown † unknown	ST	1949-1950	1	1	2	1
Hans Weber	(Switzerland)	* 8 September 1934 † 10 February 1965	ST/M	1949-1965	245	33	281	48
Peter Baumgartner	(Switzerland)	* unknown	ST	1950-1951	3	0	3	0
Oswald Capra	(Switzerland)	* 4 June 1929	GK	1950-1951	6	0	6	0
Fritz Hartmann	(Switzerland)	* unknown	CM	1950-1951	23	0	26	0
Marcel Leisinger	(Switzerland)	* unknown	ST	1950-1953	1	0	1	0
Eugen Müller	(Switzerland)	* unknown	CM	1950-1951	2	0	3	0
Max Sutter	(Switzerland)	* unknown	CB	1950-1952	24	2	29	4
Kurt Thalmann	(Switzerland)	* 3 November 1931 † 9 January 2018	ST/CM	1951-1955	95	17	107	22
Werner Wenger	(Switzerland)	* unknown	GK	1951-1953	2	0	2	0
Fritz Wolf	(Switzerland)	* 1932		1951-1952	1	0	1	0
Walter Bielser	(Switzerland)	* 20 May 1929 † 10 August 2004	ST	1952-1954; 1955-1957	66	19	106	32
Eugen Büchel	(Switzerland)	* unknown	CM	1952–1953; 1954-1955	1	0	1	0
György Mogoy	(Hungary)	* 14 August 1924	CM	1952-1956	65	6	73	6
Werner Schley }	(Switzerland)	* 25 January 1935 † 30. May 2007	GK	1952–1953; 1954-1958	86	0	96	0
Gianfranco de Taddeo	(Switzerland)	* 7 August 1928	GK	1953-1954	5	0	5	0
Walter Felber	(Switzerland)	* unknown	CM	1953-1957	2	0	2	0
Benedikt Frey	(Switzerland)	* 25 August 1930	CM	1953-1957	7	0	7	0
Alfred Hartmann	(Switzerland)	* unknown	ST	1953-1955	3	0	4	0
Ernst Klauser (Klauser II)	(Switzerland)	* 22 December 1934	ST	1953–1955; 1956-1958	13	1	13	1
René Klauser (Klauser I)	(Switzerland)	* 8 March 1929	CB	1953-1959	13	0	15	0
Luciano Merlini	(Switzerland)	* unknown	CM	1953-1955	5	0	6	0
Roman Studer		* 23 January 1933		1953-1954	1	0	1	0
Albert Haug	(Switzerland)	* 12 December 1925 † 6 February 2001	CM	1954-1955	14	0	16	0
Raymond Gilliéron	(Switzerland)	* unknown	CM	1954-1956	11	2	12	0
Hans Jordi	(Switzerland)	* 1929	CM	1954-1955	3	0	4	0
Rolf Keller	(Switzerland)	* 9 October 1936	ST	1954-1957	9	3	13	8
Juan Monros	(Spain) (Switzerland)	* 1928 † 2013	CM	1954-1955	10	4	10	4
Hansueli Oberer	(Switzerland)	* 11 May 1929	ST	1954-1962	145	23	167	26
Hans-Peter Schär	(Switzerland)	* 14 April 1936	ST	1954-1965	2	0	2	0
Romano Zolin	(Italy)	* 7 November 1935	ST	1954-1958	5	2	6	2
Hansruedi Blatter	(Switzerland)	* 1936 † 1971	GK	1955-1958	6	0	6	0
Gustav Borer	(Switzerland)	* 19 June 1930	CB/CM	1955-1958	40	0	41	1
Pierre Geiser	(Switzerland)	* 25 March 1935 † 20 September 2016	ST	1955-1957	2	1	2	1
Otto Ludwig	(Germany)	* 29 November 1934 † 17 August 2014	ST	1955-1960; 1961-1963	55	9	72	12
Bruno Michaud	(Switzerland)	* 14 October 1935 † 1 November 1997	CB	1955–1957; 1958-1970	268	19	355	22
Rudolf Rickenbacher	(Switzerland)	* 5 December 1934	ST	1955–1957; 1958-1962	48	0	55	0
Peter-Jürgen Sanmann	(Germany)	* 5 August 1935 † 15 March 2016	ST	1955-1957	45	14	51	17
Silvan Thüler	(Switzerland)	* 1 August 1932 † 13 August 2011	CM	1955-1962	150	4	167	6
Bruno Locher	(Switzerland)	* unknown	ST	1956-1957	5	0	6	0
Hans Loosli	(Switzerland)	* unknown	ST	1956-1957	4	1	5	1
Rudolf Burger	(Switzerland)	*21. July 1934	CB / ST	1957-1959	38	11	41	12
Bernhard Chenaux	(Switzerland)	* 1 September 1939	ST	1957-1961	21	2	22	2
Wilhelm Jermann	(Switzerland)	* 19 April 1932 † 12 December 2020	CB	1957-1959	5	0	5	0
Janos Magyar	(Hungary)	* 1927	ST	1957-1958	9	1	10	1
Hansruedi Meyer	(Switzerland)	* 24 April 1939	CM	1957-1959	2	0	2	0
Emil Müller	(Switzerland)	* 14 July 1933	ST	1957-1958	3	1	5	2
Walter Rieder	(Switzerland)	* 1932	ST	1957-1958	1	0	1	0
Raymond Simonet	(Switzerland)	* 15 April 1940	ST	1957-1964	11	1	13	1
Kurt Stettler	(Switzerland)	* 21 August 1932 † 8 December 2020	GK	1957-1964	160	0	191	0
Roberto Frigerio	(Switzerland)	* 16 November 1938 † 9 April 2023	ST	1958–1960; 1963-1968	144	74	185	103
René Jaeck	(Switzerland)	* 31 July 1937	CM	1958-1961	16	1	20	1
René Jeker	(Switzerland)	* 6. September 1938	GK	1958-1963	14	0	22	0
Fredy Kehrli	(Switzerland)	* 21 September 1935 † 13 October 2008	CB	1958-1959	23	0	24	0
Antoine Kohn	(Luxembourg)	* 1 November 1933 † 24 November 2012	ST	1958-1959	22	11	23	11
Jean-Jacques Maurer	(Switzerland)	* 25 Februar 1931 † 19 November 1990	CB	1958-1968	35	5	38	5
Ludwig Schraut	(Switzerland)	* 9 September 1935	ST	1958-1960	8	0	9	0
Charles Turin	(Switzerland)	* 1 June 1933	CM	1958-1959	4	0	5	0
Walter Wider	(Switzerland)	* 5 March 1927	GK	1958-1959	2	0	2	0
Jules Wyss	(Switzerland)	* 1 March 1934		1958-1959	1	0	1	0
Jean-Louis Gygax	(Switzerland)	* 17 June 1935	CM	1959-1961	13	0	17	0
Paul Speidel	(Switzerland)	* 26 July 1938	ST	1959-1962	27	2	34	3
Ferenc Stockbauer	(Hungary) (Germany)	* 6 April 1938 † 11 April 2018	ST	1959-1960	19	1	23	2
Ulrich Vetsch	(Switzerland)	* 15 March 1935 † 14 August 2014	CB	1959-1961	20	0	22	0
Jean-Claude Bourgnon		* unknown		1960-1961	2	0	2	0
Peter Brendle	(Switzerland)	* 1 October 1943	ST	1960-1961	4	0	4	0
Antonio Danani	(Switzerland)	* 22 Juni 1938	ST	1960-1961	10	1	11	1
Peter Füri	(Switzerland)	* 9 October 1937 † 11 May 2015	CM	1960-1965	71	2	95	2
Fernando Von Krannichfeldt	(Switzerland)	* 18 February 1940	CM	1960-1965	19	6	28	8
Carlo Porlezza	(Switzerland)	* 17 December 1939	CM	1960-1965	83	0	117	0
Gerhard Siedl	(Germany)	* 22 March 1929 † 9 May 1998	ST	1960-1961	10	1	10	1
Hanspeter Stocker	(Switzerland)	* 23 November 1936	CB	1960-1968	171	22	227	27
Edmund Vogt	(Switzerland)	* 7 November 1941	CB	1960-1963	33	1	43	1
Wolfgang Walther	(Switzerland)	* 21 December 1940	ST	1960-1963	31	9	41	11
Heinz Blumer	(Switzerland)	* 7 January 1942	ST	1961-1965	72	30	101	41
René Burri	(Switzerland)	* 7 July 1941	CB	1961-1965	35	3	45	8
Roland Denicola	(Switzerland)	* 6 February 1939	ST	1961-1963	4	1	6	1
Wilfried Fritz	(Germany)	* 4 June 1940	ST	1961-1963	22	6	27	6
Werner Meier	(Switzerland)	* 15 April 1937	ST	1961-1963	5	1	8	3
Markus Pfirter	(Switzerland)	* 23 September 1939	CB	1961-1968	143	29	198	40
Niklaus Stöckli	(Switzerland)	* 26 February 1939	ST	1961-1962	0	0	6	2
Walter Flück	(Switzerland)	* unknown	CM	1962-1963	0	0	1	0
Bruno Gatti	(Switzerland)	* 28 August 1941 † 2011	ST	1962-1964	32	5	41	6
Hans-Ruedi Günthardt	(Switzerland)	* 18 October 1931 † 6. September 2005	GK	1962-1969	24	0	30	0
Josef Kiefer	(Germany)	* 5 December 1942	CB	1962-1974	170	1	253	2
Abraham Levy	(Switzerland)	* 1939	CM	1962-1963	4	1	4	1
Walter Löffel	(Switzerland)	* 20 June 1936	CM	1962-1964	5	1	7	1
Enrico Mazzola	(Italy)	* 7 April 1944	CM	1962-1966	17	3	23	4
Karl Odermatt	(Switzerland)	* 17 December 1942	CM	1963-1976	312	80	411	123
Walter Baumann	(Switzerland)	* 21 July 1942	CB	1963-1966	28	2	42	3
Bruno Gabrieli	(Switzerland)	* 26 April 1939	ST	1963-1966	28	1	43	2
Arnold Hofer	(Switzerland)	* 1941	ST	1963-1964	3	3	6	5
Klaus Huber	(Switzerland)	* 1943	ST	1963-1964	4	0	4	0
János Konrád	(Hungary)	* 28 September 1945	ST	1963-1969	18	5	25	7
Marcel Kunz	(Switzerland)	* 24 May 1943 † 22 July 2017	GK	1963-1975	200	0	283	0
Erdmann Lüth	(Germany)	* 2 March 1939	ST	1963-1964	5	1	7	3
Werner Decker	(Switzerland)	* 16 July 1939 † 12 June 2017	CM	1964-1968	9	0	23	0
Mario Grava	(France)	* 1941	CM	1964-1965	8	3	11	5
Helmut Hauser	(Germany)	*7 March 1941	ST	1964-1972	146	70	215	107
Jean-Paul Laufenburger	(France)	* 19 November 1943 † 16 November 2014	GK	1964-1974	71	0	107	0
Karl Messerli	(Switzerland)	* 3 March 1947	CM	1964-1965	2	0	2	0
Aldo Moscatelli	(Switzerland)	* 2 November 1939 † 15 April 2015	CM	1964-1967	47	8	70	12
Radivoje Ognjanović	(Socialist Federal Republic of Yugoslavia)	* 1 July 1933	ST	1964-1965	15	6	17	6
Heinz Sartor	(Germany)	* 27 February 1940	ST	1964-1965	3	1	3	1
Helmut Benthaus	(Germany)	* 5 June 1935	ST	1965-1971	112	17	153	25
Alois Holenstein	(Switzerland)	* 1944	ST	1965-1966	0	0	1	0
Walter Mundschin	(Switzerland)	* 17 October 1947	CB	1965-1978	230	44	339	53
Roland Paolucci	(Switzerland)	*22 September 1947	LB	1965-1972; 1973-1976	65	4	97	10
Urs Rickenbacher	(Switzerland)	* 1945	ST	1965-1966	0	0	2	0
Silvan Schwager	(Switzerland)	* 1946	CB	1965-1966	7	0	9	0
Daniel Schnell	(Switzerland)	* 1944	CM	1965-1966	2	0	2	0
Urs Siegenthaler	(Switzerland)	* 23 November 1947	CB	1965–1973; 1978-1979	112	0	169	3
Hanspeter Vetter	(Switzerland)	* 9 January 1944	ST	1965-1968	30	9	46	10
Heini Degen	(Switzerland)	* 4 June 1940	GK	1966-1967	0	0	1	0
Bruno Rahmen	(Switzerland)	* 15 October 1948	CM	1966-1976	84	6	142	13
Peter Ramseier	(Switzerland)	* 29 November 1944 † 10 October 2018	CB	1966-1978	253	25	372	33
Anton Schnyder	(Switzerland)	* 22 October 1936	CM	1966-1969	34	1	51	1
Peter Wenger	(Switzerland)	* 10 April 1944 † 23 July 2016	CM	1966-1974	149	40	221	63
Otto Demarmels	(Switzerland)	* 29 August 1948	CB	1967-1982	307	49	446	73
Dieter Rüefli	(Switzerland)	* 9 September 1943	ST	1967-1970	35	13	48	14
Manfred Schädler	(Switzerland)	* 8 June 1944 † 28 August 2014	CB	1967-1969	2	0	2	0
Walter Balmer	(Switzerland)	* 28 March 1948 † 27 December 2010	ST	1968-1975	156	65	235	99
Paul Fischli	(Switzerland)	* 6 Mai 1945	CB	1968-1979	189	7	300	11
Walter Geisser	(Switzerland)	* 14 August 1950	CB	1968-1979	224	2	297	11
Claude Iff	(Switzerland)	* 1946	GK	1968-1969	1	0	1	0
Rolf Riner	(Switzerland)	* 24 April 1951 † 11 April 1988	CM	1968-1973	19	1	32	7
Jürgen Sundermann	(Germany)	* 25 January 1940 † 4 October 2022	RW	1968-1971	90	27	132	36
Edoardo Manzoni	(Italy)	* 20 May 1947	CM	1970-1971	7	0	7	0
Stefan Reisch	(Germany)	* 29 November 1941	RW	1970-1972	21	2	34	3
Jörg Stohler	(Switzerland)	* 27 August 1949	CB	1970-1984	306	48	425	72
Alex Wirth	(Switzerland)	* 1 April 1953	CB	1970-1978	7	0	16	0
René Hasler	(Switzerland)	* 18 June 1948	LB	1971–1976; 1979-1983	191	18	264	29
Ottmar Hitzfeld	(Germany)	* 12 January 1949	ST	1971-1975	92	66	136	94
Rolf Blättler	(Switzerland)	* 24 October 1942	CM	1971-1972	18	7	39	13
Dieter Grieshaber	(Germany)	* unknown	GK	1972-1973	1	0	1	0
Hans Müller	(Switzerland)	* 17 July 1954	GK	1972-1984	100	0	144	0
Roger Ries	(Germany)	* 30 November 1951	ST	1972-1974	6	1	7	1
Heinz Schönebeck	(Germany)	* 11 March 1949	CM	1972-1975	8	2	11	2
Teófilo Cubillas	(Peru)	* 8 March 1949	ST	1973	14	5	20	8
Markus Tanner	(Switzerland)	* 15 January 1954	ST	1973-1981	184	33	270	44
Felix Tschudin	(Switzerland)	* 19 May 1952	CB	1973-1974	6	0	6	0
Arthur von Wartburg	(Switzerland)	* 25 December 1952	CM	1973-1984	267	16	355	23
Rudolf Wampfler	(Switzerland)	* 5 October 1949	CM	1973-1974	18	2	29	6
Eigil Nielsen	(Denmark)	* 6 December 1948 † 26 December 2019	CM	1974-1978	90	18	133	27
Roland Schönenberger	(Switzerland)	* 10. Oktober 1955	ST	1974-1979	110	41	153	64
Fritz Wirth	(Switzerland)	* 14. April 1953	ST	1974-1975	16	3	19	4
Michel Amacker	(Switzerland)	* 29 September 1956	CM	1975-1976	2	0	3	0
Rolf Bucher	(Switzerland)	* 1957	CM	1975-1978	12	0	14	0
Paul Dörflinger	(Germany)	* 23 January 1955	ST	1975-1976	1	0	1	0
Daniel Hagenbuch	(Switzerland)	* 9 April 1957 † 26 August 2013	CM	1975-1979	1	0	3	0
Markus Walter Just	(Switzerland)	* 23 April 1957	CM	1975-1977	1	0	1	0
Erni Maissen	(Switzerland)	* 1 Januar 1958	ST	1975–1982; 1983-1987; 1989-1991	338	116	406	143
Peter Marti	(Switzerland)	* 12 July 1952 † 23 March 2023	ST	1975–1981; 1982-1983	146	45	203	64
Serge Muhmenthaler	(Switzerland)	* 20 May 1953	ST	1975-1978	40	21	57	26
Jürg Wenger	(Switzerland)	* 25 December 1950	GK	1975-1978	19	0	23	0
Detlev Lauscher	(Germany)	* 30 September 1952 † 15 January 2010	ST	1976-1981	134	52	183	66
Jean-Pierre Maradan	(Switzerland)	* 19 February 1954	CM	1976-1984	201	11	254	13
Silvan Corbat	(Switzerland)	* 24 January 1958	CM	1977-1979	7	1	9	1
Hans Küng	(Switzerland)	* 24 April 1949	GK	1977-1983	154	0	202	0
Erwin Meyer	(Switzerland)	* 26 November 1957	CM	1977-1980	13	3	19	3
Hansruedi Schär	(Switzerland)	* 3 August 1957	CM	1977-1982	58	4	79	4
Robert Baldinger	(Switzerland)	* 1 March 1954	CM	1978-1980	16	1	29	6
Rolf Schönauer	(Switzerland)	* 20 January 1961	CD	1978-1980	2	0	3	0
Serge Gaisser	(France)	* 5 January 1958	CM	1979-1983	71	9	90	14
Manfred Jungk	(Germany)	* 12 May 1955	CM	1979-1980	3	0	3	0
Joseph Küttel	(Switzerland)	* 27 December 1952 † 26 February 1997	ST	1979-1981	51	24	59	27
Ernst Schleiffer	(Switzerland)	* 5 December 1957	DF	1979-1981	30	0	38	0
Stefano Ceccaroni	(Switzerland)	* 12 January 1961	LB	1980-1987	46	5	57	7
Serge Duvernois	(France)	* 2 August 1960 † 5 August 2017	DF	1980-1983	40	1	48	2
Martin Jeitziner	(Switzerland)	* 13 January 1963	CM	1980–1986; 1991-1995	243	37	285	49
Martin Mullis	(Switzerland)	* 31. August 1957	ST	1980-1982	43	5	55	8
Walter Eichenberger	(Switzerland)	* 28. November 1946	GK	1981-1982	5	0	5	0
Bruno Graf	(Switzerland)	* 30 August 1953 † 15 May 2020	CD	1981-1983	19	0	30	0
Alfred Lüthi	(Switzerland)	* 22 May 1958	CB	1981-1986	105	6	123	6
Thomas Paul	(Switzerland)	* 20 March 1961	GK	1981-1986	12	0	12	0
Beat Sutter	(Switzerland)	* 12 December 1962	ST	1981-1986	114	35	141	51
Harald Nickel	(Germany)	* 21 July 1953 † 4 August 2019	ST	1981-1982	20	6	30	2
Winfried Berkemeier	(Germany)	* 22 January 1953	CM	1982-1983	22	2	24	4
Roger Bossert	(Switzerland)	* 4 October 1961	CD	1982-1983	5	0	7	0
Cesare Cosenza	(Switzerland)	* 23 June 1960	CD	1982-1983	5	0	5	0
Thomas Hauser	(Germany)	* 10 April 1965	ST	1982-1988	84	24	92	31
Nicolas Keller	(Switzerland)	* 27 May 1963	CB/CM	1982-1985	10	0	10	0
Guido Rudin	(Switzerland)	* 13 January 1963	CB/CM	1982-1985	11	0	12	0
Ruedi Zbinden	(Switzerland)	* 30 March 1959	ST	1982–1985; 1989-1993	187	38	209	45
Martin Andermatt	(Switzerland)	* 21 November 1961	CB	1983-1985	56	11	62	12
René Botteron	(Switzerland)	* 17 October 1954	CM	1983-1985	56	3	82	3
Uwe Dreher	(Germany)	* 13 May 1960 † 20 October 2016	ST	1983-1984	20	8	22	9
Fredy Grossenbacher	(Switzerland)	* 10 August 1965	CM	1983-1987	74	5	81	6
Rolf Lauper	(Switzerland)	* 17 Januar 1960 † 18 August 2006	CB	1983-1985	49	0	53	0
Peter Nadig	(Switzerland)	* 20 February 1965	CM	1983-1985	123	41	132	47
Felix Rudin	(Switzerland)	* 27 September 1965	CB/CM	1983-1986	5	0	5	0
Thomas Süss	(Germany)	* 8 April 1962	CB	1983-1987	97	0	104	0
Urs Suter	(Switzerland)	* 4 March 1959	GK	1983-1987	138	0	152	0
Ruedi Zahner	(Switzerland)	* 7 Februar 1957	CM	1983–1984; 1987-1988	19	1	20	1
Andreas Bischof	(Switzerland)	* 24 October 1961	CB	1984-1985	1	0	1	0
Livio Bordoli	(Switzerland)	* 31 August 1963	ST	1984-1985	2	0	2	0
Beat Feigenwinter	(Switzerland)	* 5 May 1960	CB	1984-1985	3	0	4	0
Dominique Herr	(Switzerland)	* 25 October 1965	CM	1984-1988	76	2	80	2
Ertan Irizik	(Switzerland) (Turkey)	* 1 December 1964	CM	1984-1986	48	0	54	0
Adrie van Kraay	(Netherlands)	* 1 August 1953	CB	1984-1985	17	0	19	0
Dominik Leder	(Switzerland)	* 4 October 1964	GK	1984-1986	4	0	4	0
Enrique Mata	(Switzerland)	* 10 May 1957	CM/ST	1985-1991	104	18	118	23
André Ladner	(Switzerland)	* 20 May 1962	CB	1985-1987	58	3	66	4
Francois Laydu	(Switzerland)	* 10 February 1960 † March 2017	CB	1985-1986	3	0	4	0
Marco Schällibaum	(Switzerland)	* 6 April 1962	RB	1985-1987	58	5	65	8
Gerd Strack	(Germany)	* 1 September 1955 † 21 May 2020	CB	1985-1987	48	9	54	12
Stefan Bützer	(Switzerland)	* 17 September 1965	CM	1986-1988	65	8	68	9
Luiz Gonçalo	(Brazil)	* 5 June 1960	ST	1986-1987	8	1	10	4
Jean-Pierre François	(France)	*7 June 1965	CM	1986-1987	12	2	12	2
Markus Füri	(Switzerland)	* 25 December 1965	CB	1986-1988	32	0	34	0
Fabio Ghisoni	(Switzerland)	* 11 September 1963	CB	1986-1988	34	2	37	2
Bruno Hänni	(Switzerland)	* 13 October 1961	CB	1986-1989	67	3	73	3
Markus Hodel	(Switzerland)	* 4 May 1961	CB	1986-1991	84	0	93	1
Adrian Knup	(Switzerland)	* 2 July 1968	ST	1986–1988; 1996-1998	69	19	108	33
Philipp Baumberger	(Switzerland)	* 6 December 1967	CM	1987-1988	4	0	5	0
Peter Bernauer	(Germany)	* 10 September 1965	CB	1987-1991	76	4	84	6
Massimo Ceccaroni	(Switzerland)	* 15 August 1968	RB	1987-2002	398	4	432	6
Uwe Dittus	(Germany)	* 3 August 1959	CM	1987-1991	97	27	107	31
Frank Eggeling	(Germany)	* 27 July 1963	ST	1987-1988	20	0	21	0
Fotios Karapetsas	(Greece)	* 21 September 1969	CM	1987-1988	2	0	2	0
Bernard Pulver	(Switzerland)	* 15 November 1963	GK	1987-1988	6	0	6	0
Patrick Rahmen	(Switzerland)	*3 April 1969	CM	1987–1991; 1992-1993	70	18	86	21
Adrian Sedlo	(Germany)	* 16 November 1969	CB	1987-1988	1	0	1	0
Bernd Schramm	(Switzerland)	* 14 February 1967	CB	1987-1988	8	0	9	0
Stephan Schaub	(Switzerland)	* 1969	CM	1987-1989	2	0	2	0
Gordon Smith	(Scotland)	* 29 December 1954	CM	1987-1988	25	3	26	3
Remo Steiner	(Switzerland)	* 30 September 1968	ST	1987-1989	13	3	13	3
Mathias Wehrli	(Switzerland)	* 9 October 1962	CM	1987-1988	2	0	2	0
V. Sundramoorthy	(Singapore)	* 6 October 1965	CM	1987-1988	5	3	5	3
Ralph Thoma	(Switzerland)	* 27 August 1965	ST	1987-1990	89	25	97	27
Beat Aebi	(Switzerland)	* 17 April 1966	MF / ST	1988-1990	26	3	31	4
Remo Brügger	(Switzerland)	* 6 December 1960	GK	1988-1989	25	0	28	0
Rolf Baumann	(Germany)	* 14 June 1963	CM	1988-1991	34	4	39	5
Andre Cueni	(Switzerland)	* 2 May 1960	CM/ST	1988-1989	11	0	13	1
Lucio Esposito	(Switzerland)	* 16 May 1967	CM/ST	1988-1989	35	13	38	15
Germano Fanciulli	(Italy)	* 28 October 1965	CM	1988-1991	31	0	35	0
Roger Glanzmann	(Switzerland)	* 15 April 1968	GK	1988-1992	1	0	2	0
Thomas Grüter	(Switzerland)	* 8 December 1966	GK	1988-1997	134	0	148	0
Jörg Heuting	(Germany)	* 11 December 1969	CM/ST	1988-1990	5	0	6	2
Boris Mancastroppa	(Switzerland)	* 2 July 1968	CM/ST	1988-1992	24	4	26	4
Mario Moscatelli	(Switzerland)	* 27 September 1963	CM/ST	1988-1990	65	18	72	20
André Rindlisbacher	(Switzerland)	* 22 January 1963	CM	1988-1990	58	1	68	2
Kurt Spirig	(Switzerland)	* 25 June 1964	CB	1988-1989	8	0	9	0
Michael Syfrig	(Switzerland)	* 5 August 1965	CB	1988-1989	31	3	36	3
Olaf Berg	(Germany)	* 28 August 1967	CM	1989-1990	1	0	1	0
Miodrag Đurđević	(Socialist Federal Republic of Yugoslavia) (Bosnia and Herzegovina)	* 2 June 1961	CB	1989-1992	33	1	35	1
Vittorio Gottardi	(Italy)	* 18 March 1967	CM	1989-1992	83	2	88	2
Patrick Liniger	(Switzerland)	* 18 August 1971	CB	1989-1989	16	0	17	0
Sascha Reich	(Switzerland)	* 24 December 1969	CB/CM	1989-1993	60	5	65	5
René Spicher	(Switzerland)	* 6 March 1963	CB/CM	1989-1990	8	1	10	1
Manfred Wagner	(Germany)	* 21 June 1968	CM/ST	1989-1993	79	9	84	11
Uwe Wassmer	(Germany)	* 22 January 1966	ST	1989-1990	28	12	33	15
Olivier Bauer	(Switzerland)	* 28 February 1972	CB	1990-1994	65	0	72	0
Reto Baumgartner	(Switzerland)	* 28 April 1961	CB	1990-1994	87	13	96	14
Brian Bertelsen	(Denmark)	* 19 April 1963	CM	1990-1991	30	11	31	11
Roman Hangarter	(Switzerland)	* 16 August 1967	CM/ST	1990-1991	4	0	4	0
Thomas Karrer	(Switzerland)	* 20 July 1972	CB	1990-1994	28	1	35	1
Maximilian Heidenreich	(Germany)	* 9 May 1967	CB	1990-1992	56	6	59	7
Christian Marcolli	(Switzerland)	* 14 March 1973	CM	1990-1993	40	6	46	12
Andreas Steiner	(Switzerland)	* 23 August 1971	CM	1990-1993	12	0	12	0
Rocco Verrelli	(Switzerland)	* 5 May 1972	CM	1990-1992	1	0	1	0
Mathias Walther	(Switzerland)	* 11 April 1972	CM	1990-1993	13	0	15	0
Walter Bernhard	(Germany)	* 24 April 1971	CM/ST	1991-1992	3	0	3	0
Mourad Bounoua	(France)	* 30 July 1972	RB	1991-1994	5	0	5	0
Gilbert Epars	(Germany)	* 10 April 1969	CM	1991-1992	10	0	13	0
Adrian Jenzer	(Switzerland)	* 5 March 1967	CM	1991-1993	29	4	34	4
Robert Kok	(Netherlands)	* 26 June 1957	RW	1991-1992	13	1	16	1
Micha Rahmen	(Switzerland)	* 1 February 1971	CM	1991-1994	40	5	50	9
Thomas Schweizer	(Germany)	* 13 September 1967	CM	1991-1992	34	4	38	6
André Sitek	(Netherlands)	* 17 April 1963	ST	1991-1993	61	44	70	56
Frank Wittmann	(Germany)	* 29 January 1970	CM/ST	1991-1994	3	1	3	1
Pasquale d'Ambrosio	(Switzerland)	* 7 October 1971		1992-1993	17	2	19	2
Ørjan Berg	(Norway)	* 20 August 1968	CM	1992-1994	65	18	76	22
Frédéric Chassot	(Switzerland)	* 31 March 1969	ST	1992-1993	14	9	14	9
Gaetano Giallanza	(Switzerland)	* 6 June 1974	ST	1992–1993; 1996-1997	43	21	48	23
Cédric Jakob	(Switzerland)	* 22 October 1973	CM	1992-1994	3	0	4	0
Dirk Lellek	(Germany)	* 3 Januar 1964 †22 April 2016	CB	1992-1994	19	4	20	4
Christian Reinwald	(Switzerland)	* 16 October 1964	GK	1992-1993	35	0	40	0
Pierre-André Schürmann	(Switzerland)	* 5 July 1960	CM	1992-1993	34	6	40	8
Mario Uccella	(Italy)	* 18 February 1966	CB	1992-1994	31	1	34	1
Marco Walker	(Switzerland)	* 2 May 1970	RB	1992-1996	110	10	123	11
Sergei Derkach	(Hungary)	* 14 November 1966	ST	1993-1996	12	0	14	0
Didier Gigon	(Switzerland)	* 10 March 1968	CM	1993-1995	35	1	41	2
Philippe Hertig	(Switzerland)	* 2 July 1965	ST	1993-1995	52	7	59	10
Stefan Huber	(Switzerland)	* 14 June 1966	GK	1993-1999	185	0	208	0
Marc Küpfer	(Switzerland)	*1973	CB	1993-1994	6	0	7	0
Markus Lichtsteiner	(Switzerland)	* 14 February 1973	CB	1993-1995	3	1	3	1
Andre Meier	(Switzerland)	* 3 March 1965	CM	1993-1996	83	0	99	0
Vincenzo Palumbo	(Germany)	*17 May 1974	CM	1993-1994	7	0	8	0
Roger Schreiber	(Switzerland)	* 21 January 1976	ST	1993-1996	4	0	5	0
Admir Smajić	(Bosnia and Herzegovina)	* 7 September 1963	CM	1993-1997	111	12	130	18
Ralph Steingruber	(Switzerland)	* 15 January 1967	CB	1993-1995	43	2	51	3
Samir Tabaković	(Bosnia and Herzegovina)	* 24 October 1967	CB	1993-1998	99	1	117	1
Dario Zuffi	(Switzerland)	* 7 December 1964	CM	1993-1998	149	37	169	51
Mario Cantaluppi	(Switzerland)	* 11 April 1974	CB/CM	1994–1996; 1998-2004	222	19	303	29
Yassine Douimi	(France)	* 28 March 1974	CM	1994-1996	4	0	5	0
Axel Kruse	(Germany)	* 28 September 1967	ST	1994	3	2	4	2
Dominic Moser	(Switzerland)	* 9 January 1975	CM	1994-1997	32	4	43	6
Andreas Niederer	(Switzerland)	* 22 August 1967	GK	1994-1995	4	0	4	0
Lars Olsen	(Denmark)	* 2 February 1961	CB	1994-1995	40	1	43	1
Alexandre Rey	(Switzerland)	* 22 September 1972	ST	1994-1996	61	15	71	23
Asif Šarić	(Bosnia and Herzegovina)	* 15 January 1965	CM	1994-1995	21	2	24	3
Thierry Schmitt	(France)	* 1974	CM	1994-1995	2	0	2	0
Mart van Duren	(Netherlands)	* 27 October 1964	ST	1994-1995	6	1	6	1
Theodoros Disseris	(Switzerland)	* 31 January 1975	CM	1995-1999	21	0	23	0
Alexander Frei	(Switzerland)	* 15 July 1979	ST	1995–1998; 2009-2013	114	74	167	109
Yannick Hasler	(Switzerland)	* 6 May 1978	CB	1995-1999	5	0	6	0
Oumar Kondé	(Switzerland) (France)	* 19 August 1979	CB	1995-1999	58	0	65	1
Daniele Moro	(Switzerland)	* 2 September 1968	CB	1995-1996	14	1	15	1
Alex Nyarko	(Ghana)	* 15 October 1973	CM	1995-1997	55	8	66	11
Gabriel Okolosi	(Niger)	* 8 July 1974	CM	1995-1996	25	2	29	4
Davide Orlando	(Switzerland)	* 13 October 1971	ST	1995-1997	40	0	49	1
Bruno Sutter	(Switzerland)	* 16 April 1977	CM	1995-1997	61	4	71	4
Marco Tschopp	(Switzerland)	* 10. Januar 1978	CM	1995-2001	63	5	70	6
Vilmar	(Brazil)	* 7 January 1968	CB	1995-1996	8	0	9	0
Hakan Yakin	(Switzerland)	* 22 February 1977	ST	1995–1997; 2001-2003	140	45	191	60
Mariano Armentano	(Argentina)	* 12 July 1974	ST	1996-1997	24	2	30	3
Remo Buess	(Switzerland)	* 13 September 1977	LB	1996-1998	2	0	2	0
Luis Calapes	(Portugal)	* 3 June 1978	LB	1996-2000	30	0	31	0
Adrian Falub	(Romania)	* 8 July 1971	CB	1996-1997	24	0	27	6
Marcello Gamberini	(Italy)	* 10 October 1961	CM	1996-1997	4	0	4	0
Mario Frick	(Liechtenstein)	* 7 September 1974	ST	1996-1999	80	30	89	33
Franco Foda	(Germany)	* 23 April 1966	CB	1996-1997	16	0	17	0
Jean-Pierre La Placa	(Switzerland)	* 15 June 1973	ST	1996-1998	41	6	46	9
Yann Poulard	(Switzerland)	* 17 June 1969	CD	1996-1997	19	0	23	0
Ivan Reimann	(Switzerland)	* 16 May 1978	CB	1996-1999	27	0	30	0
Daniel Salvi	(Switzerland)	* 29 January 1972	CB	1996-1998	29	0	36	0
Cyrill Schmidiger	(Switzerland)	* 22 June 1978	CB	1996-1998	8	0	8	0
Oliver Stöckli	(Switzerland)	* 28 December 1976	GK	1996–1998; 1999-2000; 2008-2009	11	0	17	0
Sébastien Barberis	(Switzerland)	* 31 May 1972	RW	1997-2005	205	15	282	18
Jan Berger	(Czech Republic) (Switzerland)	* 18 August 1976	CM	1997-1998	14	2	16	2
Daniel Dobrovoljski	(Russia) (Germany)	* 9 June 1975	CB	1997-1998	16	2	18	2
Maurizio Gaudino	(Germany)	* 12 December 1966	CM	1997-1998	30	10	31	10
Jürgen Hartmann	(Germany)	* 27 October 1962	CM	1997-1998	28	0	29	0
Fabrice Henry	(France)	* 13 February 1968	CM	1997-2000	25	1	28	2
Oliver Kreuzer	(Germany)	* 13 November 1965	CB	1997-2002	136	21	162	25
Deniz Mendi	(Switzerland)	* 27 February 1979	CB	1997-2000	30	2	33	2
Giorgios Nemtsoudis	(Switzerland)	* 1 January 1973	CB	1997-1998	4	0	5	0
Václav Pěchouček	(Czech Republic)	* 5 March 1979	CM	1997-1999	10	1	11	1
Marco Pérez	(Liechtenstein)	* 21 March 1978	CM	1997-2000	62	5	70	5
Marco Sas	(Netherlands)	* 16 February 1971	RW	1997-1998	14	0	14	0
Markus Schupp	(Germany)	* 7 January 1966	CM	1997	6	0	7	1
Leandro Webber	(Brazil)	* 8 November 1984	CB	1997-1998	7	0	8	0
Abedi	(Brazil)	* 14 April 1979	CM	1998-1999	25	3	26	3
Olivier Boumelaha	(France)	* 27 May 1981	ST	1998-2000	1	0	2	0
Josip Colina	(Switzerland)	* 8 November 1980	CB / CM	1998-1999	2	0	2	0
Philippe Cravero	(Switzerland)	* 2 September 1970	LB	1998-2003	108	2	132	2
Fabinho	(Bosnia and Herzegovina) (Brazil)	* 26. Juni 1972	CM	1998-1999	16	2	16	2
Benjamin Huggel	(Switzerland)	* 7 July 1977	CM	1998–2005; 2007-2012	297	61	401	82
Slaven Matan	(Switzerland)	* 17 October 1978	GK	1998-2000	1	0	4	0
Ahmed Ouattara	(Ivory Coast)	* 15 December 1969	FW	1998-1999	17	3	17	3
Dan Potocianu	(Romania)	* 5 March 1974	CM	1998-1999	10	0	10	0
Atilla Sahin	(Turkey) (Switzerland)	* 24 October 1973	CB	1998-2000	31	1	36	1
Aleksandr Rytchkov	(Russia)	* 29 September 1974	CM	1998-1999	25	5	25	5
Nestor Subiat	(Switzerland)	* 23 April 1966	ST	1998	7	4	8	7
Yilmaz Türk	(Turkey)	* 5 December 1979	CB / CM	1998-2000	0	0	1	0
Argemiro Veiga	(Brazil)	* 30 August 1972	CM	1998-1999	27	0	27	0
Çetin Güner	(Turkey)	* 28 December 1977	ST	1999-2001	21	0	28	1
Urs Güntensperger	(Switzerland)	* 24 November 1967	ST	1999-2000	6	0	7	0
Raphael Kehrli	(Switzerland)	* 14 September 1977	CB	1999-2000	24	0	30	1
Iván Knez	(Switzerland)	* 21 July 1974	CB	1999-2002	51	0	84	1
George Koumantarakis	(South Africa)	* 27 March 1974	CB	1999-2002	84	26	107	42
Alexandre Quennoz	(Switzerland)	* 21 September 1978	CB	1999-2006	98	0	142	1
Murat Yakin	(Switzerland)	* 15 September 1974	CB	1999–2000; 2000-2001; 2001-2006	114	26	150	31
Carlos Varela	(Spain)	* 15 September 1977	RW	1999-2003	88	6	133	9
Pascal Zuberbühler	(Switzerland)	* 8 January 1971	GK	1999-2006	178	0	289	0
Nenad Savić	(Serbia)	* 28 January 1981	CM	1999-2003	70	5	80	6
Agent Sawu	(Zimbabwe)	* 24 October 1971	ST	1999-2000	8	0	9	0
Didier Tholot	(France)	* 2 April 1964	ST	1999-2000	44	12	54	15
Yao Aziawonou	(Togo)	* 30 November 1979	CM	2000-2002	18	0	24	0
Romain Crevoisier	(Switzerland)	* 5 August 1965	GK	2000-2004	1	0	1	0
Thierry Ebe	(Switzerland)	* 25 June 1976	CM	2000-2001	6	0	6	0
Ivan Ergić	(Serbia)	* 21 January 1981	CM	2000-2009	202	31	283	45
Thomas Häberli	(Switzerland)	* 11 April 1974	ST	2000-2004	8	0	8	0
Miroslav König	(Slovenia)	* 1 June 1972	GK	2000-2001	32	0	41	0
Feliciano Magro	(Switzerland)	* 2 February 1979	CM	2000-2001	31	5	41	12
André Muff	(Switzerland)	* 28 January 1981	ST	2000-2001	16	3	23	8
Edmond N'Tiamoah	(Togo) (France)	* 1 February 1981	ST	2000-2002	14	0	30	1
Marco Streller	(Switzerland)	* 18 June 1981	ST	2000-2004; 2007-2015	233	111	325	144
Jean-Michel Tchouga	(Cameroon)	* 20 December 1978	ST	2000-2003	47	13	63	31
Hervé Tum	(Cameroon)	* 15 February 1979	ST	2000-2004	96	23	133	31
Scott Chipperfield	(Australia)	* 30 December 1975	LW	2001-2012	269	69	385	85
Philipp Degen	(Switzerland)	* 15 February 1983	RB	2001–2005; 2011-2016	158	8	218	13
Christian Giménez	(Argentina)	* 13 November 1974	ST	2001-2005	123	94	166	116
Timothée Atouba	(Cameroon)	* 17 February 1982	LB	2002-2004	73	3	96	5
Grégory Duruz	(Switzerland)	* 20 April 1977	CB	2002-2004	33	0	46	0
Damir Džombić	(Switzerland)	* 3 January 1985	LB	2002-2006	6	0	7	0
Antonio Esposito	(Switzerland)	* 13 December 1972	CM	2002-2004	29	4	43	7
Bernt Haas	(Switzerland)	* 8 April 1978	RB	2002-2003	22	1	37	1
Ljubo Milicevic	(Australia)	* 13 February 1981	CB	2002-2003	2	0	2	0
Eric Rapo	(Switzerland)	* 6 March 1972	GK	2002-2005	2	0	2	0
Julio Rossi	(Argentina)	* 2 February 1977	ST	2002-2005	112	36	161	52
Marco Zwyssig	(Switzerland)	* 24 October 1971	CB	2002-2005	93	3	130	5
David Degen	(Switzerland)	* 15 February 1983	RW	2003–2006; 2007-2008; 2012-2014	135	15	208	26
Matías Delgado	(Argentina)	* 15 December 1982	CM	2003-2006; 2013-2018	194	62	266	83
Samuele Preisig	(Switzerland)	* 5 April 1984	CB	2003-2005	1	0	2	0
Boris Smiljanić	(Switzerland)	* 28 September 1976	CB	2003-2007	95	11	145	12
Zé Maria	(Brazil)	* 10 November 1976	CM	2003-2004	4	0	5	0
César Andrés Carignano	(Argentina)	* 28 September 1982	ST	2004-2008	19	7	30	9
Francisco Guerrero	(Argentina)	* 23 August 1977	CM	2004	13	1	13	1
Kléber	(Brazil)	* 1 April 1980	LB	2004-2005	36	1	50	1
Thomas Mandl	(Austria)	* 7 February 1979	GK	2004-2005	1	0	1	0
Djamel Mesbah	(Algeria)	* 9 October 1984	LB	2004-2006	11	1	14	1
Patrick Müller	(Switzerland)	* 17 December 1976	CB	2004-2006	28	0	37	0
Mladen Petrić	(Croatia)	* 1 January 1981	ST	2004-2007	72	39	112	50
Mile Sterjovski	(Australia)	* 27 May 1979	RW	2004-2007	93	15	134	25
Papa Malick Ba	(Senegal)	* 11 November 1980	CM	2005-2008	79	2	112	2
Bruno Berner	(Switzerland)	* 21 November 1977	LB	2005-2007	32	0	46	0
Louis Crayton	(Liberia)	* 26 October 1977	GK	2005-2008	12	0	21	2
Eduardo da Silva	(Brazil)	* 13 October 1979	ST	2005-2009	95	17	140	27
Beg Ferati	(Switzerland)	* 10 November 1986	CB	2005–2006; 2008-2011	56	0	80	0
Mikheil Kavelashvili	(Georgia (country))	* 22 July 1971	ST	2005-2006	14	4	17	4
Baykal Kulaksızoğlu	(Switzerland)	* 12 May 1983	LW	2005-2006	15	0	26	0
Zdravko Kuzmanović	(Serbia)	* 22 September 1987	CM	2005–2007; 2015-2020	62	5	90	10
Kōji Nakata	(Japan)	* 9 July 1979	LB	2005-2008	63	3	84	8
Ivan Rakitić	(Croatia)	* 10 March 1988	CM	2005-2007	24	11	50	11
Dominik Ritter	(Switzerland)	* 23 June 1989	LB	2005-2010	1	0	5	0
Reto Zanni	(Switzerland)	* 9 February 1980	RB	2005-2011	163	5	235	5
Patrik Baumann	(Switzerland)	* 29 July 1986	CB	2006-2007	2	0	5	0
Delron Buckley	(South Africa)	* 7 December 1977	LW	2006-2007	22	1	33	4
Franz Burgmeier	(Liechtenstein)	* 7 April 1982	LW	2006-2007	23	1	35	3
Felipe Caicedo	(Ecuador)	* 5 September 1988	FW	2006-2008	45	11	61	16
Franco Costanzo	(Argentina)	* 5 September 1980	GK	2006-2011	124	0	199	0
Eren Derdiyok	(Switzerland)	* 12 June 1988	ST	2006-2009	63	17	90	25
Simone Grippo	(Switzerland)	* 12 December 1988	CB	2006-2008	0	0	1	0
Daniel Majstorović	(Sweden)	* 5 April 1977	CB	2006-2008	85	23	120	30
Michel Morganella	(Switzerland)	* 17 May 1989	RW	2006-2009	6	0	9	0
Cristiano	(Brazil)	* 3 June 1981	ST	2006-2007	7	1	14	6
Serkan Şahin	(Turkey)	* 15 February 1988	RB	2006-2010	15	0	22	1
Cabral	(Switzerland)	* 22 October 1988	CM	2007–2008; 2009-2013	99	2	153	3
Carlitos	(Portugal)	* 6 September 1982	LW	2007-2010	76	11	111	20
Fabian Frei	(Switzerland)	* 8 January 1989	CM	2007–2015; 2018-2024	386	41	543	64
Ronny Hodel	(Switzerland)	* 27 October 1982	LB	2007-2009	25	0	35	0
François Marque	(France)	* 31 July 1983	CB	2007-2010	58	0	85	0
Marko Perović	(Serbia)	* 11 January 1984	LW	2007-2009	40	10	53	11
Valentin Stocker	(Switzerland)	* 12 April 1989	LW	2007-2014; 2018-2022	286	74	416	101
David Abraham	(Argentina)	* 16 July 1986	CB	2008-2012	105	8	150	9
Federico Almerares	(Argentina)	* 2 May 1985	ST	2008-2011	41	7	76	20
Marcos Gelabert	(Argentina)	* 16 September 1981	CM	2008-2010	46	5	65	8
Vratislav Lokvenc	(Czech Republic)	* 27 September 1973	CM	2008	6	0	7	1
Jurgen Gjasula	(Albania)	* 5 December 1985	CM	2008-2009	19	2	28	2
Behrang Safari	(Sweden)	* 9 February 1985	LB	2008–2011; 2013-2016	107	1	201	1
Eduardo Rubio	(Chile)	* 7 November 1983	ST	2008-2009	9	2	14	3
Daniel Unal	(Switzerland)	* 18 January 1990	CM	2008-2011	6	0	12	0
Marco Aratore	(Switzerland)	* 4 June 1991	ST	2009-2011	1	0	6	1
Çağdaş Atan	(Turkey)	* 29 February 1980	LB	2009-2011	44	1	65	2
Massimo Colomba	(Switzerland)	* 24 August 1977	GK	2009-2012	19	0	29	0
Samuel Inkoom	(Ghana)	* 1 June 1989	RB	2009-2011	43	1	65	2
Orhan Mustafi	(Switzerland)	* 4 April 1990	ST	2009-2011	12	4	21	7
Pascal Schürpf	(Switzerland)	* 15 July 1989	ST	2009-2013	14	1	21	3
Xherdan Shaqiri	(Switzerland)	* 10 October 1991	RW	2009–2012; 2024-	126	36	169	44
Antônio da Silva	(Brazil)	* 13 June 1978	CM	2009-2010	25	2	36	2
Yann Sommer	(Switzerland)	* 17 December 1988	GK	2009-2014	113	0	170	0
Stefan Wessels	(Germany)	* 28 February 1979	GK	2009-2010	1	0	3	0
Jacques Zoua	(Cameroon)	* 6 September 1991	ST	2009-2013	86	14	128	24
Matthias Baron	(Germany)	* 17 August 1988	ST	2010-2011	4	0	7	0
Genséric Kusunga	(Angola) (Switzerland)	* 12 March 1988	CB	2010-2012	13	0	21	0
Simon Grether	(Switzerland)	* 20 May 1992	CM	2010-2014	2	0	4	0
Fwayo Tembo	(Zambia)	* 2 May 1989	ST	2010-2012	30	2	42	4
Granit Xhaka	(Switzerland)	* 27 September 1992	CM	2010-2012	44	2	67	3
Taulant Xhaka	(Albania) (Switzerland)	* 28 March 1991	CM	2010-2025	280	6	407	9
Gilles Yapi	(Ivory Coast)	* 30 January 1982	CM	2010-2013	58	3	80	3
Stjepan Vuleta	(Switzerland)	* 29 October 1993	ST	2010-2012	2	0	5	0
Arlind Ajeti	(Albania) (Switzerland)	* 25 September 1993	CB	2011-2015	27	1	52	1
Stephan Andrist	(Switzerland)	* 12 December 1987	ST	2011-2014	25	3	35	7
Roman Buess	(Switzerland)	* 21 September 1992	ST	2011-2012	1	0	2	0
Aleksandar Dragović	(Austria)	* 6 March 1991	CM	2011-2013	77	4	112	5
Marcel Herzog	(Switzerland)	* 28 June 1980	GK	2011-2012	1	0	1	0
Radoslav Kováč	(Czech Republic)	* 27 November 1979	CB	2011-2012	19	1	27	1
Pak Kwang-ryong	(North Korea)	* 27 September 1992	ST	2011-2015	14	1	21	3
Park Joo-ho	(South Korea)	* 16 January 1987	LB	2011-2014	47	1	77	1
Markus Steinhöfer	(Germany)	* 7 March 1986	RB	2011-2013	76	1	110	2
Sandro Wieser	(Liechtenstein)	* 3 February 1993	CM	2011-2013	2	0	2	0
Kay Voser	(Switzerland)	* 4 January 1987	LB	2011-2014	48	1	66	1
Endoğan Adili	(Switzerland)	* 3 August 1994	CM	2012-2014	2	0	3	0
Marcelo Díaz	(Chile)	* 30 December 1986	CM	2012-2015	58	7	95	13
Darko Jevtić	(Switzerland)	* 8 February 1993	CM	2012-2015	2	0	4	0
Mohamed Salah	(Egypt)	* 15 June 1992	ST	2012-2014	47	9	79	20
Mirko Salvi	(Switzerland)	* 14 February 1994	GK	2012–2018; 2022-	15	0	32	0
Gastón Sauro	(Argentina)	* 23 February 1990	CB	2012-2015	35	1	65	2
Fabian Schär	(Switzerland)	* 20 December 1991	CB	2012-2015	73	9	114	15
Admir Seferagić	(Bosnia and Herzegovina)	* 27 October 1994	ST	2012-2014	1	0	4	0
Germano Vailati	(Switzerland)	* 30 August 1980	GK	2012-2018	14	0	37	0
Albian Ajeti	(Albania) (Switzerland)	* 26 February 1997	ST	2013–2016; 2017-2020; 2023-	104	43	138	56
Naser Aliji	(Albania) (Switzerland)	* 27 December 1993	LB	2013-2016	29	1	42	1
Raúl Bobadilla	(Argentina)	* 18 June 1987	ST	2013	13	1	15	2
Simon Dünki	(Switzerland)	* 8 August 1994	CB	2013-2015	1	0	1	0
Mohamed Elneny	(Egypt)	* 11 July 1992	CM	2013-2016	91	3	144	10
Michael Gonçalves	(Switzerland) (Portugal)	* 19 March 1995	RB	2013-2015	0	0	1	0
Iwan Iwanow	(Bulgaria)	* 25 February 1988	CB	2013-2015	11	0	18	0
Serey Dié	(Ivory Coast)	* 7 November 1984	CM	2013–2015; 2016-2019	95	6	131	6
Giovanni Sio	(Ivory Coast)	* 31 March 1989	ST	2013-2015	30	10	48	14
Marek Suchý	(Czech Republic)	* 29 March 1988	CB	2013-2019	163	11	224	14
Davide Callà	(Switzerland)	* 6 October 1984	CM	2014-2018	95	19	128	23
Breel Embolo	(Switzerland)	*1 4 February 1997	ST	2014-2016	61	21		
Shkelzen Gashi	(Albania) (Switzerland)	* 15 July 1988	ST	2014-2016	41	25	57	32
Derlis González	(Paraguay)	* 20 March 1994	ST	2014-2015	26	3	36	6
Ahmed Hamoudi	(Egypt)	* 30 July 1990	CM	2014-2016	12	1	20	2
Robin Huser	(Switzerland)	* 24 January 1998	CM	2014–2017; 2018-2019	2	0	6	0
Yoichiro Kakitani	(Japan)	* 3 January 1990	AM	2014-2015	18	4	26	8
Walter Samuel	(Argentina)	* 23 March 1978	CB	2014-2016	29	2	47	3
Tomáš Vaclík	(Czech Republic)	* 29 March 1989	GK	2014-2018	132	0	169	0
Luca Zuffi	(Switzerland)	* 27 March 1990	CM	2014-2021	200	27	271	36
Adonis Ajeti	(Switzerland) (Albania)	* 26 February 1997	LB	2015-2016	0	0	1	0
Manuel Akanji	(Switzerland)	* 19 July 1995	CB	2015-2018	42	5	58	7
Birkir Bjarnason	(Iceland)	* 27 May 1988	CM	2015-2017	42	14	59	16
Jean-Paul Boëtius	(Netherlands)	* 22 March 1994	CM	2015-2017	14	3	23	7
Eray Cömert	(Switzerland)	* 4 February 1998	CB	2015–2017; 2018-2022	101	5	140	7
Daniel Høegh	(Denmark)	* 6 January 1991	CB	2015-2017	22	0	31	2
Nicolas Hunziker	(Switzerland)	* 23 February 1996	ST	2015-2017	3	0	4	0
Marc Janko	(Austria)	* 25 June 1983	ST	2015-2017	44	29	65	34
Cedric Itten	(Switzerland)	* 27 December 1996	ST	2015-2018	21	3	26	4
Michael Lang	(Switzerland)	* 8 February 1991	RB	2015–2018; 2021-2024	151	21	221	35
Pedro Pacheco	(Portugal)	* 21 January 1997	CB	2015-2018	0	0	1	0
Charles Pickel	(Switzerland)	* 15 May 1997	CM	2015-2017	3	0	3	0
Andraž Šporar	(Slovenia)	* 27 February 1994	ST	2015-2017	19	1	26	1
Adama Traoré	(Ivory Coast)	* 3 February 1990	LB	2015-2017	59	1	76	2
Éder Balanta	(Colombia)	* 28 February 1993	CM	2016-2020	58	3	89	5
Kevin Bua	(Switzerland)	* 11 August 1993	LW	2016-2020	70	14	102	22
Seydou Doumbia	(Ivory Coast)	* 31 December 1987	ST	2016-2017	25	20	33	21
Mohamed Elyounoussi	(Norway)	* 4 August 1994	RW	2016-2018	65	21	84	23
Alexander Fransson	(Sweden)	* 2 April 1994	CM	2016-2018	51	2	66	3
Omar Gaber	(Egypt)	* 30 January 1992	RB	2016-2017	13	0	20	0
Dereck Kutesa	(Switzerland)	* 6 December 1997	CM	2016-2018	4	0	7	0
Neftali Manzambi	(Switzerland)	* 23 April 1997	ST	2016-2019	9	1	9	1
Djordje Nikolic	(Serbia)	* 13 April 1997	GK	2016–2017; 2019-2022	11	0	25	0
Raoul Petretta	(Italy)	* 24 March 1997	LB	2016-2022	109	7	152	10
Blás Riveros	(Paraguay)	* 3 February 1998	LB	2016-2020	71	3	85	4
Dominik Schmid	(Switzerland)	* 10 March 1998	CM / LB	2016–2018; 2023-	74	6	86	6
Renato Steffen	(Switzerland)	* 3 November 1991	ST	2016-2018	63	15	86	17
Signori Antonio	(Angola)	* 25 July 1994	ST	2017-2019	1	0	1	0
Samuele Campo	(Switzerland)	* 6 July 1995	CM	2017-2021	61	15	84	19
Yves Kaiser	(Switzerland)	* 30 April 1998	CB	2017-2020	6	0	8	0
Léo Lacroix	(Switzerland)	* 27 February 1992	CB	2017-2018	9	0	10	0
Dimitri Oberlin	(Switzerland)	* 27 September 1997	ST	2017-2021	46	5	66	11
Noah Okafor	(Switzerland)	* 24 May 2000	CM	2017-2020	39	3	54	7
Afimico Pululu	(Democratic Republic of the Congo)	* 23 March 1999	ST	2017-2021	59	4	83	5
Ricky van Wolfswinkel	(Netherlands)	* 27 January 1989	ST	2017-2021	88	28	115	38
Konstantinos Dimitriou	(Greece)	* 30 June 1999	RB	2018-2021	1	0	2	0
Elis Isufi	(Switzerland)	* 21 May 2000	CB	2018-2021	6	0	9	0
Martin Hansen	(Denmark)	* 15 June 1990	GK	2018-2019	9	0	13	0
Aldo Kalulu	(France)	* 21 January 1996	ST	2018-2021	27	0	36	1
Yannick Marchand	(Switzerland)	* 9 February 2000	CM	2018-2023	21	1	26	1
Jonas Omlin	(Switzerland)	* 10 January 1994	GK	2018-2020	59	0	79	0
Tician Tushi	(Switzerland)	* 2 April 2001	ST	2018-2022	12	0	17	2
Julian Von Moos	(Switzerland)	* 1 April 2001	ST	2018-2022	17	1	19	1
Silvan Widmer	(Switzerland)	* 5 March 1993	RB	2018-2021	85	3	117	9
Carlos Zambrano	(Peru)	* 10 July 1989	CB	2018-2019	7	1	9	1
Edon Zhegrova	(Kosovo)	* 31 March 1999	ST	2018-2022	60	9	74	11
Kemal Ademi	(Germany)	* 23 January 1996	SI	2019-2020	26	13	44	15
Omar Alderete	(Paraguay)	* 26 December 1996	CB	2019-2020	31	2	54	4
Emil Bergström	(Sweden)	* 19 May 1993	CB	2019-2020	8	0	11	0
Orges Bunjaku	(Switzerland)	* 5 July 2001	CM	2019-2021	12	0	17	0
Arthur Cabral	(Brazil)	* 29 April 1998	ST	2019-2022	77	46	106	65
Louis Lurvink	(Switzerland)	* 24 January 2002	CB	2019-2022	1	0	1	0
Eric Ramires	(Brazil)	* 10 August 2000	CM	2019-2020	9	0	11	0
Mihailo Stevanović	(Serbia)	* 4 January 2002	CM	2019-2023	1	0	1	0
Lirik Vishi	(Switzerland)	* 13 June 2001	CM	2019-2022	3	0	3	0
Jasper van der Werff	(Switzerland)	* 9 December 1998	CB	2019-2021	34	1	43	1
Gonçalo Cardoso	(Portugal)	* 21 October 2000	LB	2020-2022	5	0	7	1
Carmine Chiappetta	(Switzerland)	* 9 March 2003	ST	2020-2022	4	0	5	0
Liam Chipperfield	(Switzerland)	* 14 February 2004	CM	2020-2023	5	1	8	1
Adrian Durrer	(Switzerland)	* 13 July 2001	CM	2020-2022	1	1	4	1
Felix Gebhardt	(Germany)	* 1 March 2002	GK	2020-2023	0	0	2	0
Albian Hajdari	(Kosovo)	* 18 May 2003	CB	2020-2022	9	0	9	0
Jorge	(Brazil)	* 28 March 1996	LB	2020-2021	5	0	5	0
Pajtim Kasami	(Switzerland)	* 2 June 1992	CB	2020-2022	65	16	79	19
Timm Klose	(Switzerland)	* 9 May 1988	CB	2020-2021	28	2	29	2
Heinz Lindner	(Austria)	* 17 July 1990	GK	2020-2022	67	0	81	0
Andrea Padula	(Italy)	* 4 April 1996	LB	2020-2022	16	0	20	0
Amir Abrashi	(Albania) (Switzerland)	* 27 March 1990	CM	2021	10	0	10	0
Wouter Burger	(Netherlands)	* 16 February 2001	CB	2021-2023	56	4	85	6
Nasser Djiga	(Burkina Faso)	* 15 November 2002	CB	2021-2024	11	0	22	1
Sebastiano Esposito	(Italy)	* 2 July 2002	ST	2021-2022	23	6	34	7
Joelson Fernandes	(Portugal)	* 28 February 2003	CM	2021-2022	18	0	23	0
Andrin Hunziker	(Switzerland)	* 21 February 2003	ST	2021-	8	1	7	2
Sergio López	(Spain)	* 8 April 1999	CB	2021-2024	55	3	83	3
Darian Males	(Switzerland)	* 3 May 2001	CM	2021-2023	72	9	106	19
Liam Millar	(Canada)	* 27 September 1999	CM	2021-2024	61	7	102	13
Dan Ndoye	(Switzerland)	* 25 October 2000	ST	2021-2023	61	6	93	11
Matías Palacios	(Argentina)	* 10 May 2002	CM	2021-2022	31	1	46	3
Andy Pelmard	(France)	* 12 March 2000	CB	2021-2023	67	0	105	0
Jordi Quintillà	(Spain)	* 25 October 1993	CM	2021	8	0	17	0
Kaly Sene	(Senegal)	* 28 May 2001	ST	2021-2023	11	0	19	1
Ádám Szalai	(Romania)	* 9 December 1987	ST	2021-2023	17	4	24	6
Tomás Tavares	(Portugal)	* 7 March 2001	CB	2021-2022	18	1	28	1
Marvin Akahomen	(Switzerland)	* 15 July 2007	CB	2022-	5	0	5	0
Aaron Akalé	(France)	* 20 April 2005	ST	2022-	1	0	1	0
Zeki Amdouni	(Switzerland)	* 4 December 2000	ST	2022-2023	32	12	52	22
Jean-Kévin Augustin	(France)	* 16 June 1997	ST	2022-2024	38	5	51	8
Riccardo Calafiori	(Italy)	* 19 May 2002	CB	2022-2023	26	0	38	1
Fyodor Chalov	(Russia)	* 10 April 1998	ST	2022	14	4	16	4
Arnau Comas	(Spain)	* 11 April 2000	CB	2022-2025	25	3	43	3
Nils De Mol	(Switzerland)	* 3 May 2001	GK	2022-2023	0	0	0	0
Andy Diouf	(France)	* 17 May 2003	CM	2022-2023	34	0	57	3
Emmanuel Essiam	(Ghana)	* 19 December 2003	CM	2022-	8	0	11	0
Bradley Fink	(Switzerland)	* 17 April 2003	ST	2022-2025	41	6	57	8
Marwin Hitz	(Switzerland)	* 18 September 1987	GK	2022-	100	0	126	0
Anton Kade	(Germany)	* 17 January 2004	ST	2022-	84	9	103	13
Noah Katterbach	(Germany)	* 13 April 2001	CB	2022-2023	21	1	33	1
Sayfallah Ltaief	(Switzerland)	* 22 April 2000	RW	2022-2024	6	0	10	0
Kasim Nuhu	(Ghana)	* 22 June 1995	CB	2022-2023	28	1	46	3
Adriano Onyegbule	(Germany)	* 23 June 2006	CM / LW	2022-	2	0	4	0
Strahinja Pavlović	(Serbia)	* 24 May 2001	CD	2022	10	0	10	0
Hugo Vogel	(France)	* 4 January 2004	LB	2022-	4	0	5	0
Andi Zeqiri	(Switzerland)	* 22 June 1999	ST	2022-2023	30	11	50	18
Leon Avdullahu	(Switzerland)	* 23 February 2004	CM	2023-2025	63	2	71	3
Thierno Barry	(France)	* 21 October 2002	ST	2023-2024	38	14	41	20
Adrian Leon Barišić	(Germany)	* 19 July 2001	CB	2023-	39	1	41	1
Roméo Beney	(Switzerland)	* 19 January 2005	ST	2023-2025	16	1	19	1
Yusuf Demir	(Turkey)	* 2 June 2003	RW	2023-2024	11	0	13	1
Mohamed Dräger	(Tunisia)	* 25 June 1996	RB	2023-2025	21	2	24	2
Jonathan Dubasin	(Belgium)	* 2 February 2000	RW	2023-2025	10	2	11	3
Juan Gauto	(Argentina)	* 2 June 2004	CM	2023-	23	0	24	2
Đorđe Jovanović	(Serbia)	* 15 February 1999	ST	2023-	19	2	23	6
Arlet Junior Zé	(Switzerland)	* 22 March 2006	CM / ST	2023-	9	0	11	1
Maurice Malone	(Germany)	* 17 August 2000	ST	2023-2025	12	1	16	3
Kevin Rüegg	(Switzerland)	* 5 August 1998	RB	2023-	27	0	29	0
Gabriel Sigua	(Georgia (country))	* 30 June 2005	CM	2023-	33	3	36	4
Finn van Breemen	(Netherlands)	* 25 February 2003	CB	2023-	43	2	51	3
Renato Veiga	(Portugal)	* 29 July 2003	CM	2023-2024	23	2	23	2
Romário Baró	(Portugal)	* 25 January 2000	CM	2024-2025	20	1	24	1
Kevin Carlos	(Spain)	* 10 April 2001	ST	2024-	32	12	36	14
Moussa Cissé	(France)	* 29 April 2003	RB	2024-	8	0	11	1
Léo Leroy	(France)	* 14 February 2000	CM	2024-	36	3	75	4
Joe Mendes	(Sweden)	* 31 December 2002	RB	2024-	29	1	33	1
Marin Šotiček	(Croatia)	* 18 September 2004	LW	2024-	28	4	32	6
Bénie Traoré	(Ivory Coast)	* 30 November 2002	RW	2024-	36	13	41	14
Metinho	(Brazil)	* 23 April 2003	CM	2025-	12	0	14	0
Philip Otele	(Nigeria)	* 15 April 1999	LW	2025-	18	9	21	9

== Key to positions ==
GK	Goalkeeper				
RB	Right back	LB	Left back	CB	Centre back
RW	Right winger	LW	Left winger	CM	Central Midfielder
ST	Striker				

== See also ==
- FC Basel
- History of FC Basel
- List of FC Basel seasons
- Category:FC Basel
- Category:FC Basel players

== Notes ==
=== Sources ===
- Rotblau: Jahrbuch Saison 2014/2015. Publisher: FC Basel Marketing AG. ISBN 978-3-7245-2027-6
- Die ersten 125 Jahre. Publisher: Josef Zindel im Friedrich Reinhardt Verlag, Basel. ISBN 978-3-7245-2305-5
- Verein "Basler Fussballarchiv" Homepage

(NB: Despite all efforts, the editors of these books and the authors in "Basler Fussballarchiv" have failed to be able to identify all the players, their date and place of birth or date and place of death, who played in the games during the early years of FC Basel)

- Rotblau.ch Statistik Website
- FC Basel Fan club website
- http://www.football.ch
