= 1900–01 FC Basel season =

FC Basel
1900–01 season
- Chairman: Ernst-Alfred Thalmann
- First team coach: Alphonse Schorpp (as team captain)
- Ground: Landhof, Basel
- Serie A: East group: fifth
- Top goalscorer: n/a (Note: The goal scorers in 5 of the 7 played league games during the 1900–01 season are unknown or incomplete.)
- Average home league attendance: n/a

The FC Basel 1900–01 season was their eighth season since the club's foundation on 15 November 1893. The club's new chairman was Ernst-Alfred Thalmann, who took over the presidency from Charlie Volderauer at the AGM. He was the fourth chairman in the club's history. FC Basel played their home games in the Landhof in the Quarter Kleinbasel.

== Overview ==
The first national championship in Switzerland took place in 1897–98. This championship is considered as unofficial because it was not organized by the Swiss Football Association (SFA; founded in 1895). FC Basel did not participate in this first championship. But they did in the second edition during the season 1898–99. The club did not compete in the following season either. But they have participated in every season since.

Alphonse Schorpp was nominated as team captain by the club's board of directors under chairman Ernst-Alfred Thalmann. Schorpp led the team trainings and was responsible for the line-ups. In the previous season the team played 16 friendly games. In this season they played eight friendlies and ten games in the league. There is no documentation that shows that there were pre-season friendly games this season, but there were during the winter break, four at home in the Landhof and one in Neuchâtel. At the end of the season the team twice travelled to Mulhouse, played once against FC Mulhouse and once against an Alsace selection. Of the eight friendlies four were won and two were drawn.

The Serie A 1900–01 was divided into two groups, an east and a west group. Basel were with three teams from Zürich, Grasshopper Club Zürich, FC Zürich, Fire Flies Zürich and two other teams from Basel, Old Boys and Fortuna Basel. There were four teams in the west group. The start into the season with a home draw against Fire Flies and an away victory against local rivals can be considered as good. However, in the remaining eight games the team managed only one more draw and a forfait win.

A fact is that Basel did not win a single match in the Landhof. Following the draw with Fire Flies, the team suffered four successive home defeats. A further curiosity in this season was that captain Schorpp scored his first league goal for his club on 3 March 1901 in the away game against Grasshopper Club. In fact he scored two goals, but this could not save the team from a 3–13 defeat. The reasons for this high defeat can be explained with the fact that one of the players missed the train and that the team played with a number of players from their reserve team. Apart from their surnames, Mislan, Pflüger and Trenchard Chaffey, hardly anything else is known of these three gentlemen. Despite the fact that Trenchard Chaffey scored the third Basel goal in this game, he only played in one more league game. Pflüger was documented as player in three friendlies, but the name Mislan can only be found on this one match sheet. Nevertheless, to date this remains the teams' highest and biggest defeat in the club's history.

As mentioned, Basel ended the season with two victories, two draws and six defeats in fifth position in the east group. From this group the Grasshopper Club qualified themselves for the finals against FC Bern, who were the winners of the west group. The final on 31 March was replayed because a player in GC team was non-qualified and GC won the replay to become Swiss champions for the second successive season.

== Players ==
Note: Flags indicate national team as defined under FIFA eligibility rules; some limited exceptions apply. Players may hold more than one non-FIFA nationality.

No.	Pos.	Nation	Player
—	GK	(Switzerland) SUI	Paul Hofer
—	GK	(Switzerland) SUI	Giulio Cederna
—	GK	(Switzerland) SUI	Jules Fingerlin
—	DF	(Switzerland) SUI	Daniel Hug
—	MF	(Switzerland) SUI	Ernst-Alfred Thalmann
—	FW	(Switzerland) SUI	Rudolf Gossweiler
—	FW	(Switzerland) SUI	Emil Hasler
—	FW	(Switzerland) SUI	Rudolf Landerer
—	FW	(Switzerland) SUI	Dr. Siegfried Pfeiffer
—	FW	(Switzerland) SUI	Hans Riggenbach (Riggenbach II)
—	FW	(Switzerland) SUI	Emanuel Schiess
—	FW	(Switzerland) SUI	Karl Schneider
—	FW	(Switzerland) SUI	Hermann Schneider
—		(Switzerland) SUI	Andre Burnier (Burnier II)
—		(Switzerland) SUI	Gustave Burnier (Burnier I)

No.	Pos.	Nation	Player
—		(France) FRA	Jules Gérard
—		(England) ENG	Archibald E. Gough
—		(Switzerland) SUI	G. Gürtler
—			? Heinrichs
—		(Switzerland) SUI	Eduard Laubi
—			P. Lozéron
—		(Switzerland) SUI	Alois Magnin
—			? Mislan
—		(Switzerland) SUI	Hans Rietmann
—		(Switzerland) SUI	Ami Pflüger
—		(Switzerland) SUI	Alphonse Schorpp
—		(Switzerland) SUI	Fritz Schweizer
—			? Stutz
—		(Switzerland) SUI	Paul Thalmann (Thalmann III)
—		(England) ENG	L. B. Trenchard Chaffey

== Results ==
Legend

Win Draw Loss Forfait

=== Friendly matches ===
==== Winter break ====
2 December 1900 Winter break	Basel	1 – 1	FC Neuchâtel	Landhof, Basel
15:00	Goal	Summary	Goal

9 December 1900 Winter break	Basel	4 – 1	Excelsior Basel	Landhof, Basel
	Goal	Summary	Goal

16 December 1900 Winter break	Basel	1 – 1	Fortuna Basel	Landhof, Basel
	Goal	Summary	Goal

27 January 1901 Winter break	Basel	2 – 1	La Chaux-de-Fonds	Landhof, Basel
	(1:0) (2:0)	Summary	(o.g. 2:1) Fingerlin	Referee: E. Küenzli, (FC Fortuna Basel)

3 February 1901 Winter break	FC Neuchâtel	2 – 1	Basel	Neuchâtel
	Goal	Summary	Goal

==== End of season ====
24 March 1901 End of season	FC Mulhouse	3 – 5	Basel	Mulhouse
	Goal	Summary	Goal

5 May 1901 End of season	La Chaux-de-Fonds	3 – 0	Basel	La Chaux-de-Fonds
	Goal	Summary

11 May 1901 End of season	Alsace XI	1 – 4	Basel	Mulhouse
	Goal	Summary	Goal

=== Serie A ===
==== East group matches ====
28 October 1900 Round 1	Basel	1 – 1	Fire Flies Zürich	Landhof, Basel
	H. Schneider	Summary	Goal	Referee: (France) Jules Gérard (FC Basel)

4 November 1900 Round 2	Old Boys	0 – 4	Basel	Thiersteinerallee, Basel
15:00		Summary	Thalmann I 2x Pfeiffer 2x	Referee: (Switzerland) Häberlin, (FC Bern)

11 November 1900 Round 3	Basel	2 – 4	Grasshopper Club	Landhof, Basel
	Goal	Summary	Goal	Referee: (Switzerland) Mory, (Old Boys)

18 November 1900 Round 4	Basel	0 – 2	Fortuna Basel	Landhof, Basel
		Summary	Goal	Referee: (Switzerland) Frey, (Old Boys)

25 November 1900 Round 5	Zürich	3 – 3	Basel	Hardau, Zürich
	(1:1) (2:2) (3:2)	Summary	(0:1) (1:2) (3:3)	Referee: (Switzerland) Rossi, (FC Zürich)

10 February 1901 Round 6	Fire Flies Zürich	3 – 2	Basel	Allmend Brunau, Zürich
	Lauchsinger 1x Suares (I) 1x	Summary	1x Thalmann I

17 February 1901 Round 7	Basel	2 – 3	Old Boys	Basel
	Goal	Summary	Goal	Referee: (Switzerland) Frey, (Old Boys)

3 March 1901 Round 8	Grasshopper Club	13 – 3	Basel	Zürich
	Goal	Summary	(2x) Schorpp (1x) Trenchard Chaffey	Referee: (Switzerland) Frey, (Old Boys)
Note: FCB played with only ten men, under these were four players from the reserve team

10 March 1901 Round 9	Fortuna Basel	0 – 3 FF	Basel	Basel
		Summary
Note: The FCB protested because of the unplayable pitch, which was granted. Fortuna subsequently waivered a replay.

17 March 1901 Round 10	Basel	1 – 6	Zürich	Landhof, Basel
	Goal	Summary	Goal	Referee: (Switzerland) Burkhardt, (FC Basel)

==== East group league table ====
Pos	Team	Pld	W	D	L	GF	GA	GD	Pts	Qualification
1	Grasshopper Club	10	9	0	1	55	13	+42	18	Advanced to final
2	Zürich	10	8	1	1	42	12	+30	17	
3	Fire Flies Zürich	10	4	2	4	16	20	−4	10	
4	Old Boys	10	3	1	6	10	35	−25	7	
5	Basel	10	2	2	6	21	35	−14	6	
6	Fortuna Basel	10	1	0	9	6	35	−29	2	Relegated

Source: rsssf.com

== See also ==
- History of FC Basel
- List of FC Basel players
- List of FC Basel seasons

== Notes ==
=== Footnotes ===
FCB-GC, FCZ-FCB, FFZ-FCB, FCB-OB, FCB-FCZ

== Sources ==
- Rotblau: Jahrbuch Saison 2014/2015. Publisher: FC Basel Marketing AG. ISBN 978-3-7245-2027-6
- Die ersten 125 Jahre. Publisher: Josef Zindel im Friedrich Reinhardt Verlag, Basel. ISBN 978-3-7245-2305-5
- Switzerland 1900-01 at RSSSF

(NB: Despite all efforts, the editors of these books and the authors in "Basler Fussballarchiv" have failed to be able to identify all the players, their date and place of birth or date and place of death, who played in the games during the early years of FC Basel. Much documentation for this season is missing, most goal scorers remain unknown.)
