= Jules Fingerlin =

Swiss footballer (1881-1929)

Personal information
- Full name: Jules Fingerlin
- Date of birth: 30 September 1881
- Date of death: 28 December 1929 (aged 48)
- Positions: Goalkeeper; defender

Senior career*
Years	Team	Apps	(Gls)
1899–1907	FC Basel	15	(0)
- * Club domestic league appearances and goals

Jules Fingerlin (30 September 1881 – 28 December 1929) was a Swiss footballer who played either as goalkeeper or as defender.

Fingerlin joined Basel's first team for their 1899–1900 season. During that season Basel did not compete in the Swiss championship, played only friendly games. Fingerlin played in 15 games that season, the first 14 as goalkeeper and the last as defender, a position change which was a normal thing at this period in time. He played his debut match on 8 October 1899 in the home game in the Landhof. Basel were defeated 0–4 by FC Fortuna Zürich.

During their 1900–01 season Basel played in the domestic league and came fifth in the 1900–01 Swiss Serie A east group. Fingerlin played his domestic league debut for the club in the home game on 28 October 1900 as Basel played a 1–1 draw with Fire Flies Zürich.

Between the years 1899 and 1907 Fingerlin played a total of 39 games for Basel without scoring a goal. 15 of these games were in the Swiss Serie A and 24 were friendly games.

== Sources ==
- Rotblau: Jahrbuch Saison 2017/2018. Publisher: FC Basel Marketing AG. ISBN 978-3-7245-2189-1
- Die ersten 125 Jahre. Publisher: Josef Zindel im Friedrich Reinhardt Verlag, Basel. ISBN 978-3-7245-2305-5
- Verein "Basler Fussballarchiv" Homepage
