= Rudolf Gossweiler =

Swiss footballer (born 1882)

Personal information
- Full name: Rudolf Gossweiler
- Date of birth: 8 January 1882
- Place of birth: Switzerland
- Positions: Midfielder; striker

Senior career*
Years	Team	Apps	(Gls)
1899–1903	FC Basel	15	(0)
1904–1906	Royal Antwerp F.C.		
1908–1910	FC Basel	6	(1)
- * Club domestic league appearances and goals

Rudolf Gossweiler (born 8 January 1882) was a Swiss footballer who played as striker or as midfielder during the late 1890s and early 1900s.

== Football career ==
Gossweiler joined Basel's first team for their 1899–1900 season. During this season FCB did not play domestic league football, but they played 16 friendly matches. (Note: League: Before October 1900 Basel contested only two league matches in November 1898.) Gossweiler played his first game for the club in the home game on 1 April 1900 as Basel won 6–0 against newly formed FC Kleinbasel.

In their 1900–01 season Basel contested the 1900–01 Swiss Serie A, being assigned to the East group. Gossweiler made his domestic league debut for the club in the away game on 10 March 1901 against FC Fortuna Basel. FCB protested because of the unplayable pitch, the protest was granted, Fortuna subsequently waivered a replay and the match was awarded forfait. Gossweiler scored his first goal for his club in the home game on 15 March 1903. In fact he scored two goals in that game as Basel won 8–1 against French team FC Mulhouse.

Gossweiler played with Basel for four seasons. The afore mentioned game against Mulhouse was his last game for the club, because in the summer of 1903 Gossweiler then moved to Belgium. There he joined and played for Royal Antwerp.

During 1908 he returned to Switzerland and rejoined his club of origin. In his first league match after his return, Gossweiler scored his first league goal for his club in the home game in the Landhof on 11 October 1908. But this goal could not help the team, because Basel suffered a defeat against Young Fellows Zürich. Gossweiler played another two seasons with Basel before he retired from active football. Between the years 1899 to 1903 and again from 1908 until 1910 Gossweiler played a total of 41 games for Basel scoring at least the three afore mentioned goals. (Note: Scorers: many pre-First World War game sheets no longer exist or are incomplete and so, many line ups and most goal scorers in this period remain unknown.) 21 of these games were in the Nationalliga A and 20 were friendly games.

=== Sources ===
- Rotblau: Jahrbuch Saison 2017/2018. Publisher: FC Basel Marketing AG. ISBN 978-3-7245-2189-1
- Die ersten 125 Jahre. Publisher: Josef Zindel im Friedrich Reinhardt Verlag, Basel. ISBN 978-3-7245-2305-5
- Verein "Basler Fussballarchiv" Homepage

(NB: Despite all efforts, the editors of these books and the authors in "Basler Fussballarchiv" have failed to be able to identify all the players, their date and place of birth or date and place of death, who played in the games during the early years of FC Basel)
