= 1901–02 Swiss Serie A =

Swiss football season

Swiss Serie A
- Season: 1901–02

Statistics of Swiss Super League in the 1901–02 season.

== East ==
Pos	Team	Pld	W	D	L	GF	GA	GD	Pts
1	FC Zürich	8	8	0	0	65	9	+56	16
2	Grasshopper Club Zürich	8	6	0	2	46	15	+31	12
3	Vereinigte FC St. Gallen	8	3	0	5	23	36	−13	6
4	Fire Flies Zürich	8	3	0	5	15	49	−34	6
5	Blue Stars St. Gallen	8	0	0	8	8	48	−40	0

Source: RSSSF

== Central ==
Pos	Team	Pld	W	D	L	GF	GA	GD	Pts
1	Young Boys Bern	7	5	1	1	26	8	+18	11
2	FC Basel	7	5	0	2	15	7	+8	10
3	BSC Old Boys Basel	7	4	1	2	27	6	+21	9
4	Fortuna Basel	7	1	0	6	15	49	−34	2
5	Excelsior Basel	4	0	0	4	1	29	−28	0

Source: RSSSF

== West ==
Pos	Team	Pld	W	D	L	GF	GA	GD	Pts
1	FC Bern	6	4	0	2	14	7	+7	8
2	Servette Genf	6	3	0	3	9	11	−2	6
3	FC La Chaux-de-Fonds	6	2	1	3	8	6	+2	5
4	FC Neuchatel	6	2	1	3	9	16	−7	5

Source: RSSSF

== Final ==
=== Table ===
Pos	Team	Pld	W	D	L	GF	GA	GD	Pts
1	FC Zürich	2	2	0	0	9	1	+8	4
2	Young Boys Bern	2	0	1	1	2	4	−2	1
3	FC Bern	2	0	1	1	3	9	−6	1

Source: RSSSF

=== Results ===
Team 1	Score	Team 2
6 April 1902
Zürich	2–0	Young Boys
13 April 1902
Bern	2–2	Young Boys
20 April 1902
Zürich	7–1	Bern

FC Zürich won the championship.

== Sources ==
- Switzerland 1901-02 at RSSSF
