= Archibald E. Gough =

English footballer

Personal information
- Full name: Archibald Edmond Gough
- Date of birth: 16 March 1883
- Place of birth: Marsham, Norfolk, England
- Date of death: 5 March 1970 (aged 87)
- Place of death: South Australia, Australia
- Position: Midfielder

Senior career*
Years	Team	Apps	(Gls)
1900–1902	FC Basel	4	(0)
- * Club domestic league appearances and goals

Archibald Edmond Gough (16 March 1883 – 5 March 1970) was an English footballer who played for FC Basel as a midfielder.

Gough joined Basel's first team for their 1900–01 FC Basel season under captain and coach Alphonse Schorpp. After playing in two test games Gough played his domestic league debut for the club in the away game on 10 February 1901 as Basel were defeated 2–3 by Fire Flies Zürich.

Between 1900 and 1902 Gough played a total of 12 games for Basel, without scoring a goal. Four of these games were in the Swiss Serie A and eight were friendly games. Gough was the first English person to play league football for the club, in fact to date he remains one of only three English players ever to play for Basel, the others being L. B. Trenchard Chaffey in 1901 and Hector Fisher in 1930.

== Sources ==
- Rotblau: Jahrbuch Saison 2017/2018. Publisher: FC Basel Marketing AG. ISBN 978-3-7245-2189-1
- Die ersten 125 Jahre. Publisher: Josef Zindel im Friedrich Reinhardt Verlag, Basel. ISBN 978-3-7245-2305-5
- Verein "Basler Fussballarchiv" Homepage

== Note ==
(NB: Despite all efforts, the editors of these books and the authors in "Basler Fussballarchiv" have failed to be able to identify all the players, their date and place of birth or date and place of death, who played in the games during the early years of FC Basel.)
