= Karl Rudin =

Swiss footballer

Personal information
- Full name: Karl Rudin
- Place of birth: Switzerland
- Position: Striker

Senior career*
Years	Team	Apps	(Gls)
1917–1921	FC Basel	14	(3)
- * Club domestic league appearances and goals

Karl Rudin was a Swiss footballer who played for FC Basel. He played mainly as a forward.

== Football career ==
Between the years 1917 and 1921 Rudin, played a total of 24 games for Basel scoring a total of three goals. Of all the games he played, 14 were in the Swiss Serie A and 10 were friendly games. He scored his three goals in the domestic league. The first of which was on 21 January 1918. he scored the equaliser as Basel drew 2–2 at home against Nordstern Basel.

== Sources ==
- Rotblau: Jahrbuch Saison 2017/2018. Publisher: FC Basel Marketing AG. ISBN 978-3-7245-2189-1
- Die ersten 125 Jahre. Publisher: Josef Zindel im Friedrich Reinhardt Verlag, Basel. ISBN 978-3-7245-2305-5
- Verein "Basler Fussballarchiv" Homepage
