= Rudolf Landerer =

Swiss footballer (born 1878)

Personal information
- Full name: Rudolf Landerer
- Date of birth: 7 September 1878
- Place of birth: Switzerland
- Positions: Midfielder; striker

Senior career*
| Years | Team | Apps | (Gls) |
| 1900–1903 | FC Basel | 14 | (5) |
- * Club domestic league appearances and goals

Rudolf Landerer (born 7 September 1878) was a Swiss footballer who played in the early 1900s, mainly in as forward, but also as midfielder.

Landerer joined FC Basel's first team for their 1900–01 season. After playing in just one test game in his first season, he became a regular starter in their 1901–02 season. Landerer played his domestic league debut for the club in the away game on 20 October 1901 as Basel were defeated 0–2 by local rivals Old Boys. He scored his first goal for his club in the next match, on 3 November, in the away game against FC Fortuna Basel. He scored two goals as Basel won 2–0. At the end of the league group stage, Basel were in second position, one point behind Young Boys who qualified for the finals.

Landerer stayed with the club for one more season and again in their 1902–03 season he was a regular starter, in fact he played in all seven league matches. Landerer scored one goal in their first league game against FC Bern and one goal in the next game against Fortuna. However, in this season things didn't go their way and Basel ended the group stage in third position.

Between the years 1900 and 1903 Landerer played a total of 25 games for Basel scoring a total of six goals. 14 of these games were in the Nationalliga A and 11 were friendly games. He scored five goals in the domestic league, the other was scored during the test games as Basel won the away game against French team FC Mulhouse.

== Sources ==
- Rotblau: Jahrbuch Saison 2017/2018. Publisher: FC Basel Marketing AG. ISBN 978-3-7245-2189-1
- Die ersten 125 Jahre. Publisher: Josef Zindel im Friedrich Reinhardt Verlag, Basel. ISBN 978-3-7245-2305-5
- Verein "Basler Fussballarchiv" Homepage
