= Hans Rietmann =

Swiss footballer

Personal information
- Full name: Hans Rietmann
- Date of birth: unknown
- Place of birth: Switzerland
- Positions: Midfielder; striker

Senior career*
Years	Team	Apps	(Gls)
1900–1904	FC Basel	1	(0)
- * Club domestic league appearances and goals

Hans Rietmann (date of birth unknown) was a Swiss footballer who played as striker and as midfielder during the early 1900s.

== Football career ==
Rietmann joined FC Basel's first team for their 1900–01 season. Rietmann played his domestic league debut for the club in the away game on 25 November 1900 as Basel played a 3–3 draw with FC Zürich.

For the team the 1900–01 season was a bad season, they ended the group stage in fifth position. A curiosity in this season was the away game on 3 March 1901. This was an away game against Grasshopper Club and it ended in a 3–13 defeat. The reasons for this high defeat can be explained with the fact that one of the players missed the train and that the team played with a number of players from their reserve team. Nevertheless, to date this remains the teams’ highest and biggest defeat in the club's history.

During the following two season Rietmann played mainly for Basel's second team who played in the Serie B, the second tier of Swiss football.

He again played for the first team in 1904, an away game in France against FC Mulhouse which ended in a high scoring 6–8 defeat. Rietmann was amongst the goal scorers. Between the years 1900 and 1904 Rietmann played at least five games for Basel. (Note: The player lines-ups and goal scorers for 2 of the 9 league games in the 1903–04 season are either unknown or incomplete.) One of these games were in the Swiss Serie A and the others were friendly games.

== Notes ==
=== Footnotes ===
Incomplete league matches 1903–1904 season: Bern-FCB, FCB-OB

=== Sources ===
- Rotblau: Jahrbuch Saison 2017/2018. Publisher: FC Basel Marketing AG. ISBN 978-3-7245-2189-1
- Die ersten 125 Jahre. Publisher: Josef Zindel im Friedrich Reinhardt Verlag, Basel. ISBN 978-3-7245-2305-5
- Verein "Basler Fussballarchiv" Homepage

(NB: Despite all efforts, the editors of these books and the authors in "Basler Fussballarchiv" have failed to be able to identify all the players, their date and place of birth or date and place of death, who played in the games during the early years of FC Basel.)
