= L. B. Trenchard Chaffey =

British footballer (1875–1941)

Personal information
- Full name: Lionel Bethel Trenchard Chaffey
- Date of birth: 21 September 1875
- Place of birth: Keinton Mandeville, England
- Date of death: 13 January 1941 (aged 65)
- Place of death: Oxford, England
- Position: Striker

Senior career*
| Years | Team | Apps | (Gls) |
| 1900–1901 | FC Basel | 2 | (1) |
- * Club domestic league appearances and goals

The Reverend Lionel Bethel Trenchard Chaffey (21 September 1875 – 13 January 1941) was an English clergyman and schoolmaster who was the author of language teaching books. He was also a cricket player and footballer.

== Football career ==
Son of Ebenezer Chaffey and Ellen Ann Fox, born in Keinton Mandeville, he was the seventh of nine children. He had one half-brother from his fathers first wife, who died early. He was called Trenchard, which in fact was the maiden name of his grandmother, father side. He went to school at Christ Church Choir School in Oxford and Weymouth College (public school) and obtained his Bachelor of Arts in 1897. He worked as tutor and lecturer at Borough Road College from 1898 to 1900. He moved to Switzerland in 1901 to study at the University of Basel.

Because there were no cricket teams in the area Chaffey joined FC Basel and played mainly in their second team in the Serie B, the second tier of Swiss football. In March 1901 he was called upon by their first team, because many players were unavailable to play. For Basel's first team the 1900–01 season was a bad season, they ended the group stage in fifth position. A curiosity in this season was the away game on 3 March 1901 in which Chaffey made his first team league debut. This was an away game against Grasshopper Club and Chaffey scored his first goal for the team in this match. But it could not help the team, because the match ended in a 3–13 defeat. The reasons for this high defeat can be explained with the fact that one of the players missed the train and that the team played with a number of players from their reserve team. Nevertheless, to date this remains the teams’ highest and biggest defeat in the club's history.

In his short period with Basel's first team Chaffey played a total of three games for them scoring at least that one goal. Two of these games were in the Series A and the other was a friendly game. The goal scorers in the friendly played in France against FC Mulhouse, which was won by five goals to three, are unknown. (Note: Scorers: many pre-First World War game sheets no longer exist or are incomplete and so, many line ups and most goal scorers in this period remain unknown.) Chaffey was only the second English person to play league football for the club, in fact to date he remains one of only three English players ever to play for Basel, the others being Archibald E. Gough between 1900 and 1902 and Hector Fisher in 1930.

Following his time in Switzerland, he moved for a short spell to Paris to study. After he returned to England, he was master at Durham School until 1904. It is not known if he still played football, but he returned to cricket. Chaffey obtained his Master of Arts at Eton College in 1905 and was ordained deacon in Oxford in 1909. He published language teaching books, under them Bell's First German Course, Publisher: G. Bell & Sons, London, in 1907.

== Notes ==
=== Sources ===
- Biographical Register of Christ's College, Page 791, Publisher: Cambridge University Press
- Rotblau: Jahrbuch Saison 2017/2018. Publisher: FC Basel Marketing AG. ISBN 978-3-7245-2189-1
- Die ersten 125 Jahre. Publisher: Josef Zindel im Friedrich Reinhardt Verlag, Basel. ISBN 978-3-7245-2305-5
- Verein "Basler Fussballarchiv" Homepage
