= Andre Burnier =

Swiss footballer

Personal information
- Full name: Andre Burnier
- Date of birth: unknown
- Positions: Midfielder; striker

Senior career*
| Years | Team | Apps | (Gls) |
| 1900–1901 | FC Basel | 4 | (0) |
- * Club domestic league appearances and goals

Andre Burnier (date of birth unknown) was a footballer who played as striker or as midfielder in the early 1900s.

Burnier joined Basel's first team for their 1900–01 season. Burnier played his domestic league debut for the club in the away game on 4 November 1900 as Basel won 4–0 against Old Boys. The goal scorers were twice Ernst-Alfred Thalmann and twice Siegfried Pfeiffer.

In his one season with their first team, Burnier played a total of seven games for Basel. Four of these games were in the Swiss Series A and three were friendly games.

== Sources ==
- Rotblau: Jahrbuch Saison 2017/2018. Publisher: FC Basel Marketing AG. ISBN 978-3-7245-2189-1
- Die ersten 125 Jahre. Publisher: Josef Zindel im Friedrich Reinhardt Verlag, Basel. ISBN 978-3-7245-2305-5
- Verein "Basler Fussballarchiv" Homepage

(NB: Despite all efforts, the editors of these books and the authors in "Basler Fussballarchiv" have failed to be able to identify all the players, their date and place of birth or date and place of death, who played in the games during the early years of FC Basel)
