= Gustave Burnier =

Swiss footballer

Personal information
- Full name: Gustave Burnier
- Date of birth: unknown
- Positions: Midfielder; striker

Senior career*
| Years | Team | Apps | (Gls) |
| 1900–1901 | FC Basel | 5 | (0) |
- * Club domestic league appearances and goals

Gustave Burnier (date of birth unknown) was a footballer who played as striker or as midfielder in the early 1900s.

Burnier joined Basel's first team for their 1900–01 season. Burnier played his domestic league debut for the club in the home game in the Landhof on 28 October 1900 as Basel played a 1–1 draw with Fire Flies Zürich.

In his one season with their first team, Burnier played a total of nine games for Basel. Five of these games were in the Swiss Series A and four were friendly games.

== Sources ==
- Rotblau: Jahrbuch Saison 2017/2018. Publisher: FC Basel Marketing AG. ISBN 978-3-7245-2189-1
- Die ersten 125 Jahre. Publisher: Josef Zindel im Friedrich Reinhardt Verlag, Basel. ISBN 978-3-7245-2305-5
- Verein "Basler Fussballarchiv" Homepage

(NB: Despite all efforts, the editors of these books and the authors in "Basler Fussballarchiv" have failed to be able to identify all the players, their date and place of birth or date and place of death, who played in the games during the early years of FC Basel)
