= Walter Galler =

Swiss footballer (1899–1952)

Personal information
- Full name: Walter Galler
- Date of birth: 17 June 1899
- Place of birth: Switzerland
- Date of death: 10 October 1952 (aged 53)
- Position: Forward

Senior career*
Years	Team	Apps	(Gls)
1920–1921	FC Basel	2	(0)
- * Club domestic league appearances and goals

Walter Galler (17 June 1899 – 10 October 1952) was a Swiss footballer who played for FC Basel.

Galler joined Basel in 1920. He played as a forward. In the club's 1920/21 season Galler played two games for the team, both in the Swiss Serie A, without scoring. He played his debut on 10 October 1920 in the home game at the Landhof against Aarau and the game was drawn 2–2.

== Sources ==
- Rotblau: Jahrbuch Saison 2017/2018. Publisher: FC Basel Marketing AG. ISBN 978-3-7245-2189-1
- Die ersten 125 Jahre. Publisher: Josef Zindel im Friedrich Reinhardt Verlag, Basel. ISBN 978-3-7245-2305-5
- Verein "Basler Fussballarchiv" Homepage
