= Karl Schneider (Swiss footballer) =

Swiss footballer

Personal information
- Full name: Karl Schneider
- Place of birth: Switzerland
- Position: Defender

Senior career*
Years	Team	Apps	(Gls)
1899–1901	FC Basel	7	(0)
- * Club domestic league appearances and goals

Karl Schneider was a Swiss footballer who played for FC Basel. He played in the position as defender.

Between the years 1899 and 1901 Schneider played a total of 25 games for Basel without scoring a goal. Seven of these games were in the Swiss Serie A, and 18 were friendly games. In the 1899–1900 season FC Basel did not play competitive football. He was called Schneider (II) and was the team captain in their 1900–01 season.

== Sources and references ==
- Rotblau: Jahrbuch Saison 2017/2018. Publisher: FC Basel Marketing AG. ISBN 978-3-7245-2189-1
- Die ersten 125 Jahre. Publisher: Josef Zindel im Friedrich Reinhardt Verlag, Basel. ISBN 978-3-7245-2305-5
- Verein "Basler Fussballarchiv" Homepage
