= Fritz Schweizer =

Swiss footballer

Personal information
- Full name: Fritz Schweizer
- Date of birth: unknown
- Position: Midfielder

Senior career*
Years	Team	Apps	(Gls)
1900–1902	FC Basel	13	(0)
- * Club domestic league appearances and goals

Fritz Schweizer (date of birth unknown) was a footballer who played mainly as midfielder in the early 1900s.

== Football career ==
Schweizer joined FC Basel's first team for their 1900–01 season. Schweizer played his domestic league debut for the club in the home game in the Landhof on 28 October 1900 as Basel played a 1–1 draw with Fire Flies Zürich. Schweizer became a regular starter, playing in seven of the team's nine league games. But for the team this was a bad season, they ended the season in fifth position in the group stage.

A curiosity in this season was the away game on 3 March 1901. This was an away game against Grasshopper Club and it ended in a 3–13 defeat. The reasons for this high defeat can be explained with the fact that one of the players missed the train and that the team played with a number of players from their reserve team. Nevertheless, to date this remains the team's highest and biggest defeat in the club's history.

Schweizer stayed with the team one more season and played in six of the seven league matches. Compared to the previous season, Basel played better this league season and ended the group stage in second position in the table.

During his two seasons with the club, Schweizer played at least 24 games for Basel without scoring a goal. (Note: Many pre-First World War game sheets no longer exist or are incomplete and so, most goal scorers in this period remain unknown.) 13 of these games were in the Swiss Serie A and 11 were friendly games.

== Notes ==
=== Sources ===
- Rotblau: Jahrbuch Saison 2017/2018. Publisher: FC Basel Marketing AG. ISBN 978-3-7245-2189-1
- Die ersten 125 Jahre. Publisher: Josef Zindel im Friedrich Reinhardt Verlag, Basel. ISBN 978-3-7245-2305-5
- Verein "Basler Fussballarchiv" Homepage

(NB: Despite all efforts, the editors of these books and the authors in "Basler Fussballarchiv" have failed to be able to identify all the players, their date and place of birth or date and place of death, who played in the games during the early years of FC Basel)
