= Willy Geiser =

Swiss footballer (born 1903)

Personal information
- Full name: Wilhelm Geiser
- Date of birth: 15 November 1903
- Date of death: unknown
- Positions: Midfielder; striker

Senior career*
Years	Team	Apps	(Gls)
1920–1923	FC Basel	20	(0)
- * Club domestic league appearances and goals

Willy Geiser (born 15 November 1903; date of death unknown) was a footballer who played for FC Basel in the 1920s mainly as midfielder but also as striker.

== Football career ==
Geiser joined FC Basel's first team during their 1920–21 season. In this season he played only one friendly match on 29 May 1921 at home in the Landhof as Basel won 6–0 against German team Karlsruher FV. After playing in one more friendly game Geiser played his domestic league debut for the club in the away game on 25 July 1921 as Basel played a 1–1 draw with Biel-Bienne.

Geiser played with the team for three season and during this time he played a total of 26 games for Basel without scoring a goal. 20 of these games were in the Swiss Serie A and six were friendly games.

== Sources ==
- Rotblau: Jahrbuch Saison 2017/2018. Publisher: FC Basel Marketing AG. ISBN 978-3-7245-2189-1
- Die ersten 125 Jahre. Publisher: Josef Zindel im Friedrich Reinhardt Verlag, Basel. ISBN 978-3-7245-2305-5
- Verein "Basler Fussballarchiv" Homepage
