= Jules Gérard =

French footballer

Personal information
- Full name: Jules Gérard
- Date of birth: unknown
- Place of birth: France
- Position: Midfielder

Senior career*
| Years | Team | Apps | (Gls) |
| 1899–1901 | FC Basel | 3 | (0) |
- * Club domestic league appearances and goals

Jules Gérard (date of birth unknown) was a French footballer who played in the early 1900s mainly as midfielder.

== Football career ==
Gérard joined FC Basel's first team during their 1899–1900 season. Basel did not compete in the domestic championship this season. Gérard played his first friendly game for the club in the away game on 6 May 1900 as Basel were defeated 1–5 by FC Concordia Zürich.

In the following season Gérard played his domestic league debut for the club in the away game on 25 November 1900 as Basel played a 3–3 draw with Zürich. But for the team this was a bad season, they ended the season in fifth position in the group stage.

A curiosity in this season was the away game on 3 March 1901. This was an away game against Grasshopper Club and it ended in a 3–13 defeat. The reasons for this high defeat can be explained with the fact that one of the players missed the train and that the team played with a number of players from their reserve team. Nevertheless, to date this remains the teams’ highest and biggest defeat in the club’s history.

In his two seasons with the team Gérard played at least eight games for Basel without scoring a goal. (Note: Many pre-First World War game sheets no longer exist or are incomplete. So, most goal scorers remain unknown.) Three of these games were in the Swiss Serie A and five were friendly games. Gérard also acted as referee during the friendly games.

== Notes ==
=== Sources ===
- Rotblau: Jahrbuch Saison 2017/2018. Publisher: FC Basel Marketing AG. ISBN 978-3-7245-2189-1
- Die ersten 125 Jahre. Publisher: Josef Zindel im Friedrich Reinhardt Verlag, Basel. ISBN 978-3-7245-2305-5
- Verein "Basler Fussballarchiv" Homepage

(NB: Despite all efforts, the editors of these books and the authors in "Basler Fussballarchiv" have failed to be able to identify all the players, their date and place of birth or date and place of death, who played in the games during the early years of FC Basel.)
