= Paul Thalmann (footballer) =

Swiss footballer (born 1884)

Personal information
- Full name: Paul Ulrich Thalmann
- Date of birth: 16 October 1884
- Date of death: Switzerland
- Positions: Midfielder; striker

Senior career*
Years	Team	Apps	(Gls)
1899–1904	FC Basel	7+	(0)
- * Club domestic league appearances and goals

Paul Thalmann (born 16 October 1884) was a Swiss footballer who played as a striker or midfielder in the early 1900s.

== Football career ==
Thalmann joined FC Basel's first team for its 1899–1900 season. In that season, the club did not compete in the Swiss Serie A and played only friendly games. Thalmann played his first game with the team in the away match in the Stadion Schützenmatte on 21 January 1900 when Basel were beaten 1–3 by local rivals Old Boys. Thalmann played five friendly games in his first season and in his second season he played mainly with Basel's reserve team. After playing in seven friendly games, he played his first domestic league match for the club in the home game at the Landhof on 23 November 1902 when Basel was defeated 1–2 by Old Boys.

Thalmann played for Basel's first team for four season and during this time he played a total of 18 games for Basel. Seven of these games were in the Swiss Serie A and 11 were friendly games. He probably played in more games than mentioned, but the documentation is incomplete. (Note: The player lines-ups in 1 match and goal scorers in 3 matches of the 7 league games during the 1901–02 season are unknown or incomplete.) (Note: The player line-ups and goal scorers for 2 of the 9 league games in the 1903–04 season are unknown or incomplete.)

== Notes ==
=== Footnotes ===
Incomplete league matches 1901–1902 season: FCB-OB, Excelsior-FCB, FCB-Fortuna

Incomplete league matches 1903–1904 season: Bern-FCB, FCB-OB

=== Sources ===
- Rotblau: Jahrbuch Saison 2017/2018. Publisher: FC Basel Marketing AG. ISBN 978-3-7245-2189-1
- Die ersten 125 Jahre. Publisher: Josef Zindel im Friedrich Reinhardt Verlag, Basel. ISBN 978-3-7245-2305-5
- Verein "Basler Fussballarchiv" Homepage

(NB: Despite all efforts, the editors of these books and the authors in "Basler Fussballarchiv" have failed to be able to identify all the players, their date and place of birth or date and place of death, who played in the games during the early years of FC Basel)
