= 1900–01 Swiss Serie A =

Swiss football season

Swiss Serie A
- Season: 1900–01

The 1900–01 Swiss Serie A season was the 1900–01 season of the Swiss national football league championship.

== Overview ==
The 1900–01 Swiss Serie A was divided into two groups, an east and a west group. The east group had three teams from Zürich, Grasshopper Club Zürich, FC Zürich, Fire Flies Zürich and three teams from Basel, FC Basel, Old Boys and Fortuna Basel. There were four teams in the west group, FC La Chaux-de-Fonds, Servette Genf, FC Neuchâtel and FC Bern. From the east group the Grasshoppers qualified themselves for the finals against FC Bern who were the winners of the east group.

The final was played on 31 March 1901 in Aarau, but a player from the Grasshopper Club was not-qualified and the result was voided and replayed. The replay was on 14 April, again in Aarau, and the Grasshopper Club won 2-0 and became Swiss Champions.

== Qualification groups ==
=== East ===
Pos	Team	Pld	W	D	L	GF	GA	GD	Pts	Qualification
1	Grasshopper Club Zürich	10	9	0	1	55	13	+42	18	Qualified for final
2	FC Zürich	10	8	1	1	42	12	+30	17	
3	Fire Flies Zürich	10	4	2	4	16	20	−4	10	
4	BSC Old Boys Basel	10	3	1	6	10	35	−25	7	
5	FC Basel	10	2	2	6	21	35	−14	6	
6	Fortuna Basel	10	1	0	9	6	35	−29	2	

Source: rsssf.com

=== West ===
Pos	Team	Pld	W	D	L	GF	GA	GD	Pts	Qualification
1	FC Bern	6	5	0	1	16	2	+14	10	Qualified for final
2	FC La Chaux-de-Fonds	6	3	0	3	13	10	+3	6	
3	Servette Genf	6	2	0	4	10	11	−1	4	
4	FC Neuchâtel	6	2	0	4	7	13	−6	4	

Source: rsssf.com

== Final ==
Team 1	Score	Team 2
31 March 1901
Grasshopper	2–0	Bern

The final was voided and repeated because the Grasshopper fielded an unqualified player.

Replay

Team 1	Score	Team 2
14 April 1901
Grasshopper	2–0	Bern

Grasshopper Club Zürich won the championship.

== See also ==
- 1900–01 FC Basel season

== Sources ==
- Switzerland 1900-01 at RSSSF
