= 1919–20 FC Basel season =

FC Basel
1919–20 season
- Chairman: Bernard Klingelfuss
- First team coach: Otto Kuhn (as team captain)
- Ground: Landhof, Basel
- Serie A: Group Stage: 2nd
- Top goalscorer: League: Karl Wüthrich (9); All: Alfréd Schaffer (18)
- Average home league attendance: n/a

The FC Basel 1919–20 season was their twenty-seventh season since the club's foundation on 15 November 1893. The club's chairman was Bernard Klingelfuss. FC Basel played their home games in the Landhof in the district Wettstein in Kleinbasel.

== Overview ==
Otto Kuhn was team captain and acted, so to say, as coach. Basel played a total of 44 matches in their 1919–20 season. 14 of these were in the domestic league and 30 were friendly matches.

From these 30 friendlies, 15 were against foreign opponents. Five were played against German teams. Basel travelled to Germany and played against Karlsruher FV, 1. FFC Germania 1894 and 1. FC Pforzheim. During the winter break the team travelled to Italy and on Christmas Day played against Genoa C.F.C., on boxing day against SG Andrea Doria and the next day against US Biellese. They also played at home against Rapid Wien. At the end of the season Basel were hosts to Victoria Hamburg, Royal Charleroi SC, Royale Union Saint-Gilloise, Budapesti EAC, Ferencvárosi TC, MTK Budapest and Wiener Amateur Sportverein. Altogether 14 friendlies were home games, played in the Landhof and 16 were away games. Of these 18 ended in a victory, one match was drawn and 11 ended in a defeat. In these test games Basel scored a total of 68 goals and conceded 44.

The former Hungarian international footballer Alfréd Schaffer joined Basel in April 1920 and played in 19 test matches and one league games, during which he scored a total of 27 goals.

The domestic league, Swiss Serie A 1919–20, was divided into three regional groups, East, Central and West, each group with eight teams. FC Basel and the two other teams from Basel Nordstern and Old Boys were allocated to the Central group. The other teams playing in this group were Aarau, Luzern and Biel-Bienne and the two teams from the capital, Young Boys and FC Bern. FC Basel played a good season, winning seven matches, drawing four and suffering just three defeats. They ended the season in second position with 18 points. In their 14 games Basel scored 32 goals and conceded 20. Karl Wüthrich was the team's top goal scorer with 9 goals. BSC Young Boys won the group and continued to the finals.

There was no relegation this year because the reserve team Nordstern were Serie B champions and could not be promoted because the first team already plays at top level. With a victory against Servette and a goalless draw against Grasshopper Club the Young Boys won the Swiss championship.

The Serie A away match played on 7 March 1920 against Biel-Bienne in Gurzelen Stadion was the last game that Wilhelm Dietz played as he died 4 weeks later aged just 19 years old.

== Players ==
Squad members

Note: Flags indicate national team as defined under FIFA eligibility rules; some limited exceptions apply. Players may hold more than one non-FIFA nationality.

No.	Pos.	Nation	Player
—	GK	SUI	Walter Birbaum
—	GK	SUI	Arthur Fahr
—	GK	SUI	Ernst Zorzotti (III)
—	DF		Fritz Grüssi
—	DF		Karl Kroepfli
—	DF	AUT	Gustav Putzendopler (I)
—	DF	SUI	Peter Riesterer
—	MF	SUI	Walter Rupprecht
—	MF		Ganter (I)
—	MF	SUI	Ernst Kaltenbach
—	MF	SUI	Jakob Känzig
—	MF	SUI	Otto Kuhn
—	MF	AUT	Karl Putzendopler (II)
—	MF	SUI	Fritz
—	FW	SUI	Christian Albicker (I)
—	FW	SUI	Karl Bielser
—	FW		Gustav Buser

No.	Pos.	Nation	Player
—	FW	SUI	Walter Dietrich
—	FW	SUI	Wilhelm Dietz (I)
—	FW	SUI	Paul Dietz (II)
—	FW	SUI	Jules Düblin
—	FW	SUI	Karl Ibach
—	FW	SUI	Karl Lott (I)
—	FW	HUN	Sándor Nemes
—	DF	SUI	Louis Riesterer
—	FW	SUI	Karl Rudin
—	FW	HUN	Alfréd Schaffer
—	FW		Carl Schloz
—	FW	SUI	Karl Wüthrich
—			Ernst Hasler
—			Friedrich Lott (II)
—			Fritz Müller
—			Hans Schneider
—			Siegrist

== Results ==
Legend

Win Draw Loss Postponed

=== Friendly matches ===
==== Pre- and mid-season ====
12 July 1919 Basel championship	Nordstern Basel (Switzerland)	4–2	(Switzerland) Basel	Margarethenwiese, Basel
17:30	Afflerbach (1:0); Hermann (2:1) (3:2); Afflerbach (4:2)	Summary	(1:1) (2:2)	Attendance: 800; Referee: (Switzerland) Jacques Hirrle (Basel)

20 July 1919 Basel championship	Old Boys (Switzerland)	2–4	(Switzerland) Basel	Margarethenwiese, Basel
	Grunauer (1:0); Katz (2:2)	Summary	(1:1) Dietz (I) (1:2) Buser (2:3) Albicker (I) (pen. 2:4) Dietz (I)

20 July 1919 Basel championship	Nordstern Basel (Switzerland)	0–1	(Switzerland) Basel	Margarethenwiese, Basel
15:00		Summary	(0:1) Bielser	Attendance: 1,200

7 September 1919 Pre-season	Karlsruher FV (Germany)	1–2	(Switzerland) Basel	Karlsruhe
	Hirsch (1:1)	Summary	(0:1) (1:2) Lott (I)

14 September 1919 Pre-season	1. FFC Germania 1894 (Germany)	0–4	(Switzerland) Basel	Frankfurt am Main
		Summary	10' (0:1) (0:2) (0:3) (0:4)

21 September 1919 Pre-season	1. FC Pforzheim (Germany)	2–1	(Switzerland) Basel	Pforzheim
	(1:1) (2:1)	Summary	(0:1)

5 October 1919 Mid-season	Grasshopper Club (Switzerland)	0–1	(Switzerland) Basel	St. Gallen
		Summary	(0:1)

5 October 1919 Mid-season	St. Gallen (Switzerland)	3–2	(Switzerland) Basel	St. Gallen
	Goal	Summary	Goal

23 November 1919 Mid-season	Basel (Switzerland)	4–1	(Germany) VfB Leipzig	Landhof, Basel
14:30	Dietz (I) 6' (1:0); Wüthrich (2:1); Dietz (I) (3:1); Dietz (II) (4:1)	Summary	(pen. 1:1) Hansi	Attendance: 2,000; Referee: (Switzerland) Riesterer (Basel)

30 November 1919 Mid-season	Biel-Bienne (Switzerland)	3–1	(Switzerland) Basel	Biel/Bienne
	Goal	Summary	Goal

==== Winter break to end of season ====
25 December 1919 Winter break	Genoa C.F.C. (Italy)	4–0	(Switzerland) Basel	Stadio Luigi Ferraris, Genoa
12:00	(1:0) (2:0) (3:0) (4:0)	Summary		Attendance: 12,000

26 December 1919 Winter break	SG Andrea Doria (Italy)	1–3	(Switzerland) Basel	Stadio Luigi Ferraris, Genoa
15:00	(1:2)	Summary	(0:1) Dietz (II) (0:2) Bielser (1:3) Dietz (I)

27 December 1919 Winter break	US Biellese (Italy)	2–3	(Switzerland) Basel	Stadio Comunale, Biella
15:00	(1:0) (2:0)	Summary	(2:1) Kuhn (2:2) Kuhn (2:3) Kuhn

1 January 1920 Winter break	Basel (Switzerland)	0–1	(Austria) Rapid Wien	Landhof, Basel
14:30		Summary	(0:1) Kuthan	Attendance: 4,000; Referee: (Switzerland) Schmid (Basel)

22 February 1920 Mid-season	Vgt FC Winterthur-Veltheim (Switzerland)	3–1	(Switzerland) Basel	Winterthur
14:45	Kuhn (1:1); Weilenmann (2:1); Weilenmann (3:1)	Summary	(0:1) Wüthrich	Referee: (Switzerland) Müller (Winterthur)

28 March 1920 Mid-season	Basel (Switzerland)	1–1	(Switzerland) Vgt FC Winterthur-Veltheim	Landhof, Basel
15:00	Kuhn 10' (1:0)	Summary	(1:1) Frankenfeld	Referee: (Switzerland)

3 April 1920 End of season	Basel (Switzerland)	3–0	(Germany) Victoria Hamburg	Landhof, Basel
16:30	Kuhn 6' (pen. 1:0); Wüthrich 27' (2:0); Schaffer 71' (3:0)	Summary		Attendance: 1,000; Referee: (Switzerland) Schenker (Basel)

5 April 1920 End of season	Basel (Switzerland)	3–0	(Belgium) Royal Charleroi SC	Landhof, Basel
15:00	Schaffer (1:0) (o.g. 2:0); Schaffer (3:0)	Summary		Referee: (Switzerland) Schenker (Basel)

11 April 1920 End of season	Basel (Switzerland)	1–3	(Belgium) Royale Union Saint-Gilloise	Landhof, Basel
16:00	Kaltenbach (1:3)	Summary	34' (0:1) Vergeylen; 51' (0:2) Much; 75' (0:3) Thys	Attendance: 3,500; Referee: (Switzerland) Stutz (Luzern)

2 May 1920 End of season	Basel (Switzerland)	1–0	(Switzerland) Old Boys	Landhof, Basel
15:00	Schaffer 80' (1:0)	Summary		Attendance: 1,200; Referee: (Hungary) László Balint (Zürich)

9 May 1920 End of season	FC Bern (Switzerland)	4–3	(Switzerland) Basel	Kirchenfeld, Bern
15:00	Quinclet (1:0); Galli (2:0); Brand (3:2); Galli (4:2)	Summary	(2:1) Kaltenbach (2:2) (4:3)	Attendance: 1,500

13 May 1920 End of season	Nordstern Basel (Switzerland)	0–4	(Switzerland) Basel	Margarethenwiese, Basel
15:00		Summary	17' (0:1) Schaffer; 65' (0:2) Müller; 77' (0:3) Schaffer; 89' (0:4) Müller	Attendance: 700; Referee: (Switzerland) Riesterer (Basel)

30 May 1920 End of season	Basel (Switzerland)	3–0	(Switzerland) Zürich	Landhof, Basel
15:00	Schaffer 2' (1:0); Müller (2:0); Müller (3:0)	Summary		Attendance: 800; Referee: (Hungary) László Balint (Zürich)

6 June 1920 End of season	Basel (Switzerland)	4–0	(Switzerland) Étoile-Sporting	Landhof, Basel
15:00	Schaffer 5' (1:0); Schaffer 56' (2:0); Schaffer 60' (3:0); Wüthrich 86' (4:0)	Summary		Attendance: 3,000; Referee: (Switzerland) Herren (Basel)

8 June 1920 End of season	Basel (Switzerland)	4–0	(Hungary) Budapesti EAC	Landhof, Basel
18:30	Ibach 20' (1:0); Dietrich 59' (2:0); Schaffer 65' (3:0); Wüthrich (4:0)	Summary		Attendance: 2,000; Referee: (Hungary) László Balint (Zürich)

13 June 1920 End of season	Basel (Switzerland)	6–1	(Switzerland) FC Bern	Landhof, Basel
15:00	Wüthrich 17' (1:0); Schaffer 33' (2:0); Schaffer (3:1); Schaffer (4:1); Schaffer (5:1); Schaffer 82' (6:1)	Summary	(2:1) Quinclet	Attendance: 1,200; Referee: (Switzerland) Herren (Basel)

20 June 1920 End of season	Zürich (Switzerland)	1–2	(Switzerland) Basel	Utogrund, Zürich
	Sturzenegger (1:2)	Summary	(0:1) Schaffer (0:2) Schaffer	Referee: (Hungary) László Balint (Zürich)

4 July 1920 End of season	Basel (Switzerland)	2–1	(Turkey) Ferencvárosi TC	Landhof, Basel
16:00	Dietrich 61' (1:1); Wüthrich 71' (2:1)	Summary	44' (0:1) Toth	Attendance: 1,500; Referee: (Switzerland) Jacques Hirrle (Basel)

11 July 1920 End of season	Basel (Switzerland)	1–3	(Hungary) MTK Budapest	Landhof, Basel
16:00	(pen. 1:1)	Summary	19' (0:1) Winkler; Kuhn (o.g. 1:2) (1:3) Winkler	Attendance: 4,000; Referee: (Switzerland) Jacques Hirrle (Basel)

18 July 1920 End of season	Basel (Switzerland)	1–3	(Austria) Wiener Amateur Sportverein	Landhof, Basel
16:30	Nemes (1:3)	Summary	(0:1) Konrad (II) (o.g. 0:2); 76' (0:3) Hansl	Attendance: 4,000; Referee: (Hungary) László Balint (Zürich)

=== Serie A ===
==== Central Group results ====
28 September 1919 Round 1	Basel	2–2	Young Boys	Landhof, Basel
15:00	Dietz (I) 47' (1:0); Wüthrich 52' (2:0)	Summary	(2:1) Funk (I); 88' (2:2) Funk (II)	Attendance: 1,000; Referee: (Switzerland) Wieland Zürich

12 October 1919 Round 2	Aarau	3–0	Basel	Schachen, Aarau
15:00	Tanner 20' (1:0); Tanner (2:0); Brändl 89' (pen. 3:0)	Summary		Referee: (Switzerland) Fricker Zürich

19 October 1919 Round 3	Basel	3–0	Old Boys	Landhof, Basel
15:20	Wüthrich 20' (1:0); Wüthrich 55' (2:0); Lott (I) 59' (3:0)	Summary		Attendance: 2,500; Referee: (Switzerland) Gachnang Zürich

26 October 1919 Round 4	Nordstern Basel	0–1	Basel	Margarethenwiese, Basel
15:00		Summary	50' (0:1) Dietz (II)	Attendance: 2,500; Referee: (Switzerland) Stutz Basel

9 November 1919 Round 5	Basel	3–2	Luzern	Landhof, Basel
14:45	Kuhn 53' (pen. 1:1); Wüthrich 58' (2:1); Dietz (II) 63' (3:1)	Summary	(0:1) Ulrich (3:2) Halter	Attendance: 1,000; Referee: (Switzerland) Fricker Zürich

7 December 1919 Round 6	FC Bern	1–1	Basel	Kirchenfeld, Bern
15:00	Küng (1:0)	Summary	88' (1:1) Wüthrich	Referee: (Switzerland) Reich Winterthur

14 December 1919 Round 7	Old Boys	2–1	Basel	Margarethenwiese, Basel
14:30	Lüscher I 57' (1:1); Lüscher I (2:1)	Summary	10' (1:10) Wüthrich	Attendance: 1,200; Referee: (Switzerland) Weber Gustav St. Gallen

21 December 1919 Round 8	Basel	3–2	Aarau	Landhof, Basel
14:35	Dietz (II) (1:1); Dietz (II) (2:1); Albicker (I) 79' (3:2)	Summary	20' (0:1) von Arx II} 75' (2:2)	Attendance: 1,300; Referee: (Switzerland) Stutz Basel

25 January 1920 Round 9	Basel	6–1	FC Bern	Landhof, Basel
14:30	Dietz (II) (1:1); Wüthrich (2:1); Bielser (3:1); Berlincourt (o.g. 4:1); Wüthrich (5:1); Dietz (I) (6:1)	Summary	12' (0:1) Weiss	Attendance: 1,500; Referee: (Switzerland) Gachnang Zürich

8 February 1920 Round 10	Luzern	2–2	Basel	Tribschen, Luzern
	Sormani 20' (1:1); Tobler 82' (2:2)	Summary	10' (0:1) Dietz (I); 60' (1:1)	Referee: (Switzerland) Fricker Zürich

29 February 1920 Round 11	Basel	1–2	Nordstern Basel	Landhof, Basel
15:00	Wüthrich (1:2)	Summary	(0:1) Berret (0:2) Berret	Attendance: 3,000; Referee: (Switzerland) Reich Winterthur

7 March 1920 Round 12	Biel-Bienne	0–3	Basel	Gurzelen Stadion, Biel/Bienne
		Summary	(0:1) (0:2) (0:3)	Attendance: 800

21 March 1920 Round 13	Young Boys	3–3	Basel	Kasernenmatte, Bern
15:00	Fässler 30' (1:0); Dasen (II) 28' (2:0); Funk (II) (3:1)	Summary	(pen. 2:1) Kuhn (3:2) Zorzotti (3:3) Albicker (I)	Referee: (Switzerland) Wieland Zürich

28 March 1920 Round 14	Basel	3–0 FF	Biel-Bienne	Landhof, Basel
		Summary

FC Biel-Bienne declared Forfait. As a replacement, a friendly match against Winterthur took place on the same date.

==== Central Group league table ====
Pos	Team	Pld	W	D	L	GF	GA	GD	Pts	Qualification
1	Young Boys Bern	14	12	2	0	41	13	+28	26	Advance to finals
2	Basel	14	7	4	3	32	20	+12	18	
3	Aarau	14	6	4	4	24	14	+10	16	
4	Nordstern Basel	14	7	2	5	21	18	+3	16	
5	Old Boys	14	5	2	7	19	30	−11	12	
6	Luzern	14	4	3	7	18	28	−10	11	
7	FC Bern	14	4	1	9	19	30	−11	9	
8	Biel-Bienne	14	1	2	11	15	36	−21	4	No relegation this year

Source: rsssf.com

== See also ==
- History of FC Basel
- List of FC Basel players
- List of FC Basel seasons

== Sources ==
- Rotblau: Jahrbuch Saison 2014/2015. Publisher: FC Basel Marketing AG. ISBN 978-3-7245-2027-6
- Die ersten 125 Jahre. Publisher: Josef Zindel im Friedrich Reinhardt Verlag, Basel. ISBN 978-3-7245-2305-5
- FCB team 1919–20 at fcb-archiv.ch
- Switzerland 1919-20 at RSSSF
