= 1920–21 FC Basel season =

FC Basel
1919–20 season
- Chairman: Franz Rinderer
- First team coach: Walter Dietrich (as team captain)
- Ground: Landhof, Basel
- Serie A: Group Stage: 7th
- Top goalscorer: League: Karl Wüthrich (8); All: Karl Wüthrich (28)
- Highest home attendance: n/a
- Lowest home attendance: n/a

The FC Basel 1920–21 season was their twenty-eighth season since the club's foundation on 15 November 1893. The club's chairman was Franz Rinderer who took over from Bernard Klingelfuss. FC Basel played their home games in the Landhof in the district Wettstein in Kleinbasel.

== Overview ==
Walter Dietrich was team captain and acted as coach. Basel played a total of 40 matches in their 1919–20 season, scoring 80 goals and conceded 62. 14 of these matches plus the playoff were in the domestic league and the other 25 were friendly matches.

Of these 25 friendlies, 13 were played against German teams, one was against AS Strasbourg and one was against Juventus. The game against Juventus was played in the Olympique de la Pontaise. Just before the end of the season Basel made a tour of north Germany and played three games in four days against Hannover 96, Victoria Hamburg and Kieler SV Holstein. 10 were home games played in the Landhof and 15 were away games. 15 of these games ended with a victory, six were drawn and only four ended with a defeat. In these test games Basel scored a total of 60 goals and conceded 33. Otto Kuhn played in 24 of these games scoring 13 times and Karl Wüthrich played in 19 test games scoring 20 times, which means that these two players scored more than half of the team's goals.

The domestic league, Swiss Serie A 1920–21, was divided into three regional groups, East, Central and West, each group with eight teams. FC Basel and two other teams from Basel Nordstern and Old Boys were allocated to the Central group. The other teams playing in this group were the two teams from the capital, Young Boys Bern and FC Bern as well as Aarau, Luzern and Biel-Bienne.

As opposed to the good results in the friendly games, Basel played a very bad season. Eight of the first ten games ended in a defeat, in fact the first victory was the eleventh round match against FC Bern. Basel only moved off the last position in the league table because they won the playoff against Luzern. They ended the season in second last position with just six points. They only won two championship matches, drawing two and suffering ten defeats. In their 14 games Basel scored just 18 goals and conceded 29. Karl Wüthrich was the team's top league goal scorer with 8 goals. The reigning champions Young Boys won the group and continued to the finals. Despite the victory against Servette, the Young Boys lost 3–1 against Grasshopper Club who therefore became the new Swiss champions.

== Players ==
Squad members

Note: Flags indicate national team as defined under FIFA eligibility rules; some limited exceptions apply. Players may hold more than one non-FIFA nationality.

No.	Pos.	Nation	Player
—	GK	SUI	Arthur Fahr
—	GK	SUI	Ernst Zorzotti (III)
—	DF		Karl Kroepfli
—	DF	SUI	Hermann Moll
—	DF	AUT	Gustav Putzendopler (I)
—	DF	SUI	Peter Riesterer
—	MF	SUI	Walter Rupprecht
—	MF	SUI	Emil Hasler
—	MF	SUI	Ernst Kaltenbach
—	MF	SUI	Jakob Känzig
—	MF	SUI	Otto Kuhn
—	MF	AUT	Karl Putzendopler (II)
—	MF	SUI	Fritz
—	MF	SUI	Ruppli
—	FW	SUI	Karl Bielser

No.	Pos.	Nation	Player
—	FW	SUI	Fritz Bucco
—	FW		Gustav Buser
—	FW	SUI	Walter Dietrich
—	FW	SUI	Paul Dietz (II)
—	FW	SUI	Jules Düblin
—	FW	SUI	Walter Galler (I)
—	FW	SUI	Karl Ibach
—	FW	SUI	Karl Lott (I)
—	DF	SUI	Müller
—	FW	SUI	Karl Rudin
—	FW	HUN	Alfréd Schaffer
—	FW	SUI	Karl Wüthrich
—			Albert Albrecht
—	MF		Galler (II)
—			Willy Geiser

== Results ==
Legend

Win Draw Loss Postponed

=== Friendly matches ===
==== Pre- and mid season ====
21 August 1920 Pre-season	Basel (Switzerland)	2–7	(Germany) Karlsruher FV	Landhof, Basel
17:15	Kuhn 48' (1:2); Schaffer (2:4)	Summary	27' (0:1) Würzburger (0:2) (1:3) (1:4) (2:5) (2:6) (2:7)	Attendance: 1,500; Referee: (Switzerland) Schenker Basel

29 August 1920 Pre-season	Cantonal Neuchâtel FC (Switzerland)	1–3	(Switzerland) Basel	Parc des Sports Colombier
14:30	Goal	Summary	Schaffer; Schaffer; Schaffer

4 September 1920 Pre-season	Servette (Switzerland)	2–4	(Switzerland) Basel	Stade des Eplatures, La Chaux-de-Fonds
16:00	(1:0) (2:0)	Summary	(2:1) Schaffer (2:2) Schaffer (2:3) Müller (2:4) Putzendopler (II)	Referee: (Switzerland) John Forster La Chaux-de-Fonds

5 September 1920 Pre-season	Étoile-Sporting (Switzerland)	0–0	(Switzerland) Basel	Stade des Eplatures, La Chaux-de-Fonds
16:00		Summary		Referee: (Switzerland) Guido Eichenberger Bern

9 September 1920 Pre-season	Basel (Switzerland)	1–1	(Switzerland) St. Gallen	Landhof, Basel
10:30	Putzendopler (I) 50' (1:0)	Summary	60' (1:1) Angehrn	Attendance: 1,000; Referee: (Switzerland) Schenker Basel

19 September 1920 Pre-season	Juventus (Italy)	1–3	(Switzerland) Basel	Olympique de la Pontaise, Lausanne
13:45	Giriodi (1:3)	Summary	(0:1) Putzendopler (I) (0:2) Putzendopler (I) (0:3) Schaffer	Referee: (Switzerland) Humberset
Note: In the last minute of the game, Juventus was awarded a penalty. It hits the post and the rebound was shot in by Blando. The referee decides on offside, but changes his mind afterwards. It is not known whether Basel won 3–1 or 3–2 (source: SFAZ).

20 September 1920 Pre-season	Grasshopper Club (Switzerland)	1–2	(Switzerland) Basel	Olympique de la Pontaise, Lausanne
15:30	Martenet (1:2)	Summary	(0:1) Schaffer (0:2) Schaffer	Attendance: 400; Referee: (Switzerland) Humberset

7 November 1920 Mid-season	Freiburger FC (Germany)	0–0	(Switzerland) Basel	Freiburg
		Summary

12 December 1920 Mid-season	Basel (Switzerland)	2–1	(Switzerland) Cantonal Neuchâtel FC	Landhof, Basel
14:30	Dietrich (1:0); Wüthrich (2:0)	Summary	(2:1)	Attendance: 500; Referee: (Switzerland) Rinderer Basel

==== Winter break and mid-season ====
25 December 1920 Winter break	1. FC Nürnberg (Germany)	2–0	(Switzerland) Basel	Nürnberg
	Böss (1:0); Träg (2:0)	Summary		Attendance: 5,000

1 January 1921 Winter break	Basel (Switzerland)	2–3	(Germany) Freiburger FC	Landhof, Basel
14:30	Albicker (I) (1:0); Albicker (I) (2:2)	Summary	(1:1) Nicolsen (1:2) Fuchs (o.g. 2:3) Kuhn	Attendance: 2,000; Referee: (Switzerland) Felix Herren Basel

9 January 1921 Winter break	AS Strasbourg (France)	2–5	(Switzerland) Basel	Strassbourg
14:15	(1:2) (2:4)	Summary	(0:1) Kuhn (0:2) Kuhn (1:3) Dietz (II) (1:4) Dietz (II) (2:5) Riesterer	Attendance: 2.000

23 January 1921 Winter break	Basel (Switzerland)	3–1	(Germany) 1. FC Pforzheim	Landhof, Basel
14:45	Kuhn (pen. 1:0); Wüthrich (2:0); Wüthrich (3:1)	Summary	(2:1)	Attendance: 1,000; Referee: (Switzerland) Jacques Hirrle Basel

13 February 1921 Mid-season	Winterthur (Switzerland)	1–3	(Switzerland) Basel	Schützenwiese, Winterthur
	Kuhn (pen. 1:3)	Summary	(0:1) Dietz (II) (0:2) Wüthrich (0:3) Wüthrich	Attendance: 600; Referee: (Switzerland) Koblet Winterthur

27 February 1921 Mid-season	Basel (Switzerland)	4–2	(Switzerland) Servette	Landhof, Basel
15:00	Wüthrich (1:0); Wüthrich (2:0); Wüthrich (3:1); Wüthrich (4:1)	Summary	30' (pen. 1:2) Wyss (I) (4:2)	Attendance: 1.500; Referee: (Switzerland) Felix Herren Basel

6 March 1921 Mid-season	Servette (Switzerland)	1–3	(Switzerland) Basel	Parc des Sports, Genf
14:45	Wyss (I) 60' (1:1)	Summary	58' (0:1) Dietz (II) (1:2) Wüthrich; 80' (1:3) Dietz (II)	Attendance: 3,000; Referee: (Switzerland) Epiney Genf

25 March 1921 Mid-season	Hannover 96 (Germany)	0–4	(Switzerland) Basel	Hannover
		Summary	Wüthrich; Wüthrich; Wüthrich; Kuhn	Attendance: 10,000; Referee: (Switzerland) Jacques Hirrle Basel

26 March 1921 Mid-season	Victoria Hamburg (Germany)	2–2	(Switzerland) Basel	Hamburg
	Goal	Summary	Wüthrich; Wüthrich	Attendance: 10,000; Referee: (Switzerland) Jacques Hirrle Basel

28 March 1921 Mid-season	Kieler SV Holstein (Germany)	1–1	(Switzerland) Basel	Holstein-Stadion, Kiel
	5' (1:0)	Summary	70' (1:1) Dietz (II)	Attendance: 6,000; Referee: (Switzerland) Jacques Hirrle Basel

8 May 1921 End of season	Basel (Switzerland)	4–1	(Switzerland) La Chaux-de-Fonds	Landhof, Basel
15:00	Kuhn 15' (1:0); Wüthrich 16' (2:0); Kuhn 30' (3:0); Bucco (4:1)	Summary	40' (3:1)	Attendance: 1,000; Referee: (Switzerland) Schenker Basel

15 May 1921 End of season	SG Germania Wiesbaden (Germany)	2–3	(Switzerland) Basel	Wiesbaden
	Goal	Summary	Kuhn; Kuhn; Dietrich	Referee: (Switzerland) Jacques Hirrle Basel

16 May 1921 End of season	1. FSV Mainz 05 (Germany)	0–0	(Switzerland) Basel	Mainz
		Summary		Referee: (Germany) Emmerich Köln

29 May 1921 End of season	Basel (Switzerland)	6–0	(Germany) Karlsruher FV	Landhof, Basel
15:00	Wüthrich 12' (1:0); Kuhn (2:0); Kuhn (3:0); Wüthrich (4:0); Kuhn (5:0); Kroepfli (6:0)	Summary		Attendance: 1,500; Referee: (Switzerland) Schenker Basel

12 June 1921 End of season	Basel (Switzerland)	3–0	(Germany) Wacker München	Landhof, Basel
15:00	Kuhn 41' (1:0); Wüthrich 56' (2:0); Wüthrich 85' (3:0)	Summary		Attendance: 4,000; Referee: (Switzerland) Jacques Hirrle Basel

19 June 1921 End of season	Basel (Switzerland)	0–1	(Germany) 1. FC Nürnberg	Landhof, Basel
15:00		Summary	44' (0:1) Träg	Attendance: 5,000; Referee: (Switzerland) Jacques Hirrle Basel

=== Serie A ===
==== Central Group results ====
26 September 1920 Round 1	Young Boys	4–1	Basel	Kasernenmatte, Bern
15:00	Dasen (1:1); Funk (II) (2:1); Dasen (3:1); Funk (II) (4:1)	Summary	(0:1) Putzendopler (I)	Attendance: 4,000; Referee: (Switzerland) Jacques Hirrle Basel

3 October 1920 Round 2	Basel	2–2	Aarau	Landhof, Basel
15:00	Wüthrich (1:2); Dietrich (2:2)	Summary	(0:1) Näf (0:2) Märki	Attendance: 2,500; Referee: (Switzerland) Weber

10 October 1920 Round 3	Old Boys	3–2	Basel	Margarethenwiese, Basel
15:00	Röscher (1:1); Wionsowsky (2:1); Merkt (3:2)	Summary	3' (pen. 0:1) Wüthrich (pen. 2:2) Wüthrich	Attendance: 3,000; Referee: (Switzerland) Fricker Zürich

24 October 1921 Round 4	Basel	1–1	Nordstern Basel	Landhof, Basel
15:00	Bielser (1:0)	Summary	(1:1) Rölle	Attendance: 3,000; Referee: (Hungary) László Balint Zürich

31 October 1920 Round 5	Luzern	2–1	Basel	Tribschen, Luzern
	Sormani (1:0); Hunziker (2:1)	Summary	(1:1) Kaltenbach	Attendance: 1,200; Referee: (Switzerland) Maurer Zürich

14 November 1921 Round 6	Basel	0–2	Biel-Bienne	Landhof, Basel
15:00		Summary	(pen. 0:1) Toth (0:2) Toth	Attendance: 3,000; Referee: (Switzerland) Fricker Zürich

28 November 1920 Round 7	FC Bern	2–0	Basel	Kirchenfeld, Bern
15:00	Küng 25' (1:0); Brandt (2:0)	Summary		Attendance: 1,500; Referee: (Switzerland) Müller Winterthur

5 December 1920 Round 8	Basel	0–1	Young Boys	Landhof, Basel
15:00		Summary	(0:1) Osterwalder	Attendance: 2,000; Referee: (Switzerland) Fricker Zürich

19 December 1920 Round 9	Aarau	3–1	Basel	Schachen, Aarau
	Diggelmann 26' (1:0); Märki 81' (2:0); Märki 86' (3:0)	Summary	(3:1) Putzendopler (II)	Referee: (Switzerland)

16 January 1921 Round 10	Nordstern Basel	3–2	Basel	Landhof, Basel
14:45	Rölle (1:1); Meier (2:1); Rölle (pen. 3:1)	Summary	(0:1) Dietz (II) (3:2) Riesterer	Attendance: 3,000; Referee: (Switzerland) Ruegg Thalwil

30 January 1921 Round 11	Basel	3–0	FC Bern	Landhof, Basel
15:00	Wüthrich (1:0); Kuhn (2:0); Kuhn (3:0)	Summary		Attendance: 4,000; Referee: (Switzerland) Jacques Hirrle Basel

13 March 1921 Round 12	Biel-Bienne	1–0	Basel	Gurzelen Stadion, Biel/Bienne
	Minder (1:0)	Summary		Attendance: 3,000; Referee: (Switzerland) Ducrest Fribourg

20 March 1921 Round 13	Basel	1–4	Old Boys	Landhof, Basel
15:00	Wüthrich (pen. 1:2)	Summary	2' (0:1) Kalt (0:2) Wionsowsky (1:3) Wionsowsky (1:4) Dürr	Attendance: 3,500; Referee: (Switzerland) Reich Winterthur

17 April 1921 Round 14	Basel	4–1	Luzern	Landhof, Basel
15:00	Kuhn (1:0); Wüthrich (pen. 2:1); Wüthrich (3:1); Kuhn (4:1)	Summary	(1:1) Gross	Attendance: 2,000; Referee: (Switzerland) Guido Eichenberger Bern

==== Last-place play-off ====
1 May 1921 Playoff	Basel	2–0	Luzern	Landhof, Basel
	Wüthrich 12' (1:0); Kuhn 66' (2:0)	Summary		Attendance: Schachen, Aarau; Referee: (Switzerland) Edm. Dizerens Lausanne

==== Central Group league table ====
Pos	Team	Pld	W	D	L	GF	GA	GD	Pts	Qualification
1	Young Boys	15	9	4	2	30	15	+15	22	Advance to finals
2	Old Boys	15	9	2	4	32	22	+10	20	
3	Biel-Bienne	14	7	5	2	26	12	+14	19	
4	Nordstern Basel	14	6	4	4	23	17	+6	16	
5	FC Bern	14	5	3	6	26	30	−4	13	
6	Aarau	14	3	6	5	13	20	−7	12	
7	Basel	15	3	2	10	20	29	−9	8	Seventh place after play-off
8	Luzern	15	2	2	11	17	42	−25	6	To promotion/relegation play-off

Source: rsssf.com

== See also ==
- History of FC Basel
- List of FC Basel players
- List of FC Basel seasons

== Sources ==
- Rotblau: Jahrbuch Saison 2014/2015. Publisher: FC Basel Marketing AG. ISBN 978-3-7245-2027-6
- Die ersten 125 Jahre. Publisher: Josef Zindel im Friedrich Reinhardt Verlag, Basel. ISBN 978-3-7245-2305-5
- FCB team 1920–21 at fcb-archiv.ch
- Switzerland 1920-21 at RSSSF
