= 1918–19 FC Basel season =

FC Basel
1918–19 season
- Chairman: August Rossa
- First team coach: Otto Kuhn (as team captain)
- Ground: Landhof, Basel
- Serie A: Group Stage: 5th
- Top goalscorer: League: Otto Kuhn (6); All: Otto Kuhn (7) (figures incomplete)
- Average home league attendance: Figures n/a

The FC Basel 1918–19 season was their twenty-sixth season since the club's foundation on 15 November 1893. The club's chairman was August Rossa who took over from Franz Rinderer at the club's AGM. FC Basel played their home games in the Landhof in the district Wettstein in Kleinbasel. World War I was still being fought as the Swiss season started.

== Overview ==
Otto Kuhn was team captain and acted, so to say, as coach. Basel played a total of 30 matches in their 1918–19 season. 14 of these were in the domestic league and 16 were friendly matches. There were nine test games played in the Landhof and seven away games. Because of the war, all but one of these friendlies were played against Swiss teams. The war ended on 1 November 1918 and six months later, on 18 May 1919 Basel hosted their only foreign opponents, the German team Freiburger FC. Despite an early lead, the game ended in a 1–2 defeat.

Nine of these friendlies were won and six ended in a sporting defeat. The 27 October 1918 was the Football Association day. The Basel teams played a tournament. The match in the afternoon between Basel and Nordstern Basel was abandoned during play, because following a crude foul, the FCB's right half was injured and had to leave the pitch due to his injury. His team then demanded the exclusion of the Nordstern player, who had already been negatively noted during the morning game. The referee did not respond to the request, therefore the entire FC Basel team walked off the pitch. The referee abandoned the game and awarded the victory forfeit 3:0 to Nordstern.

The domestic league, Swiss Serie A 1918–19, was divided into three regional groups, East, Central and West, each group with eight teams. FC Basel and the two other teams from Basel Nordstern and Old Boys were allocated to the Central group. The other teams playing in this group were Aarau, Luzern and Biel-Bienne and the two teams from La Chaux-de-Fonds, Étoile-Sporting and FC La Chaux-de-Fonds. FC Basel did not play a very good season, suffering six defeats. They ended the season in fifth position with 13 points.

In their 14 league games Basel scored 27 goals and conceded 26. Otto Kuhn was the team's best goal scorer netting six times and Ernst Kaltenbach was second best scorer with four goals. Étoile-Sporting won the group, continued to the finals and won the Swiss championship.

== Players ==
Squad members

Note: Flags indicate national team as defined under FIFA eligibility rules; some limited exceptions apply. Players may hold more than one non-FIFA nationality.

No.	Pos.	Nation	Player
—	GK	SUI	Arthur Fahr
—	GK	SUI	Emil Fehr
—	GK		Paul Rittel (III)
—	GK	SUI	Ernst Zorzotti (III)
—	DF		Emil Ganter
—	DF		Karl Kroepfli
—	DF	SUI	Hermann Moll
—	DF	SUI	Peter Riesterer
—	DF		Anton Rittel
—	MF	SUI	Walter Rupprecht
—	MF	SUI	Ernst Kaltenbach
—	MF	SUI	Jakob Känzig

No.	Pos.	Nation	Player
—	MF	SUI	Otto Kuhn
—	MF	SUI	Fritz Raas
—	FW	SUI	Christian Albicker (I)
—	FW	SUI	Karl Bielser
—	FW		Rudolf Bredschneider
—	FW		Albert Buser
—	FW		Gustav Buser
—	FW		Wilhelm Dietz (I)
—	FW		Karl Lott (I)
—	FW		Karl Rudin
—	FW		Carl Schloz
—	FW	SUI	Karl Wüthrich

== Results ==
Legend

Win Draw Loss Postponed

=== Friendly matches ===
==== Pre and mid-season ====
1 September 1918 Pre-season	Old Boys (Switzerland)	1–2	(Switzerland) Basel	Margarethenwiese, Basel
15:00	Danzeisen (I) 10' (1:0)	Summary	35' (1:1) Dietz (I) (1:2) Dietz (I)	Attendance: 1,000; Referee: (Switzerland) Hs. Grunauer (Basel) (Switzerland) E. Buser (Old Boys)

8 September 1918 Pre-season	Young Boys (Switzerland)	3–2	(Switzerland) Basel	Kirchenfeld, Bern
15:00	Ramseyer 5' (1:0); Dasen (I) 15' (2:0); Dasen (I) (3:2)	Summary	(2:1) (2:2)	Referee: (Switzerland) Beuchat

22 September 1918 Pre-season	Basel (Switzerland)	1–0	(Switzerland) FC Neumünster Zürich	Landhof, Basel
15:00	(pen.)	Summary

27 October 1918 Mid-season	Basel (Switzerland)	1–0	(Switzerland) Nordstern Basel	Landhof, Basel
10:00	Buser (1:0)	Summary		Referee: (Switzerland) Ohlmann (Basel)
Note: Football Association day tournament. Match played as 2x 25 Minutes.

27 October 1918 Mid-season	Basel (Switzerland)	2–0	(Switzerland) Old Boys	Landhof, Basel
11:00	Wüthrich (1:0); Kuhn (pen. 2:0)	Summary		Referee: (Switzerland) Schmidt (Basel)
Note: Football Association day tournament. Match played as 2x 25 Minutes.

27 October 1918 Mid-season	Basel (Switzerland)	0–3 FF	(Switzerland) Nordstern Basel	Landhof, Basel
15:00 (2x 25 Minutes played)		Summary	(pen. 1:0) ?	Referee: (Switzerland) Zoller Old Boys (Basel)
Note: Football Association day tournament. Match played as 2x 25 Minutes. After a bad foul, the FCB half right defender is injured and had to leave the field. Basel demanded the exclusion of the Nordstern player, who had already attracted negative attention in the morning. The referee did not respond to the request, so the Basel team left the field and the game was abandoned.

17 November 1918 Mid-season	Military Team Zürich (Switzerland)	1–5	(Switzerland) Basel	Zürich
	Goal	Summary	Goal

15 December 1918 Mid-season	Basel (Switzerland)	4–1	(Switzerland) Freiburger Military Team	Landhof, Basel
13:30	50' (1:1) (2:1) (3:1) (o.g. 4:1)	Summary	30' (0:1)	Attendance: 2,000

==== Winter break and mid-season ====
4 January 1919 Winter break	Nordstern Basel (Switzerland)	5–1	(Switzerland) Basel	Margarethenwiese, Basel
	Wüthrich (1:1); Wüthrich (2:1); Dietz (3:1); Wüthrich (4:1); Afflerbach (5:1)	Summary	5' (0:1) Buser	Attendance: 1,200; Referee: (Switzerland) Grunauer (Basel)

2 March 1919 Mid-season	Basel (Switzerland)	2–4	(Switzerland) Concordia Basel	Basel
	Goal	Summary	Goal

9 March 1919 Mid-season	Basel (Switzerland)	3–1	(Switzerland) Team Basel	Landhof, Basel
	(1:0) (2:0) (3:0)	Summary	(3:1)

6 April 1919 Basel championship	Basel (Switzerland)	4–0	Old Boys	(Switzerland) Landhof, Basel
15:00	Bielser 3' (1:0); Bielser 60' (2:0); Albicker (I) (3:0); Wüthrich (4:0)	Summary		Referee: (Switzerland) Jacques Hirrle (Basel)

13 April 1919 Mid-season	Freiburger FC (Switzerland)	2–1	(Switzerland) Basel	FC Stadium, Freiburg
	Goal	Summary	Goal	Attendance: 2,500

18 May 1919 Mid-season	Basel (Switzerland)	1–2	(Germany) Freiburger FC	Landhof, Basel
10:30	Buser (1:0)	Summary	(1:1) Bantle (1:2)	Referee: (Switzerland) Riesterer (Basel)

6 June 1919 Mid-season	Montriond Lausanne (Switzerland)	2–1	(Switzerland) Basel	Olympique de la Pontaise, Lausanne
15:00	Hope (1:0); Wydler (2:1)	Summary	(1:1)	Referee: (Switzerland) Diserens

9 June 1919 Mid-season	Montriond Lausanne (Switzerland)	0–2	(Switzerland) Basel	Olympique de la Pontaise, Lausanne
14:30		Summary	(0:1) Dietz (I) (pen. 0:2) Albicker (I)	Referee: (Switzerland) Diserens

=== Serie A ===
==== Central Group results ====
6 October 1918 Round 1	La Chaux-de-Fonds	4–1	Basel	Parc des Sports, La Chaux-de-Fonds
14:30	Goal	Summary	Goal	Attendance: 2,000

13 October 1918 Round 2	Luzern	1–1	Basel	Stadium Tribschen, Luzern
15:15	Tobler (1:0)	Summary	(1:1) Dietz (I)	Attendance: 800; Referee: (Switzerland) Willy Beuttner FC Zürich

20 October 1918 Round 3	Old Boys	4–3	Basel	Margarethenwiese, Basel
15:15	Danzeien I 26' (pen. 1:0); Katz 33' (2:0) (3:0); Katz 50' (4:0)	Summary	60' (4:1) Buser; 70' (4:2) Kuhn; 80' (4:3)	Referee: (Switzerland) Walter Senn Aarau

3 November 1918 Round 4	Basel	3–2	Biel-Bienne	Landhof, Basel
	Kuhn 20' (1:0); Kuhn (2:1); Kaltenbach (3:2)	Summary	(1:1) Borlé (2:2) Keller	Attendance: 1,500; Referee: (Switzerland) Eugène Stutz Luzern

1 December 1918 Round 5	Basel	3–4	Étoile-Sporting	Landhof, Basel
15:00	Wüthrich; Kuhn; Kuhn	Summary	Brönnimann; Marucco; Wyss I Wyss I	Referee: (Switzerland) Willy Beuttner FC Zürich

8 December 1918 Round 6	Basel	0–1	Nordstern Basel	Landhof, Basel
		Summary	35' (0:1) Afflerbach	Attendance: 2,000; Referee: (Switzerland) Daniel Wenger Basel

22 December 1918 Round 7	Basel	3–2	Old Boys	Landhof, Basel
14:30	Ganter 5' (1:0); Kaltenbach (2:1); Ganter (3:1)	Summary	33' (1:1) Danzeisen (3:2) Katz	Attendance: 300; Referee: (Switzerland) Guido Eichenberger Bern

9 March 1919 Round 8	Nordstern Basel	2–1	Basel	Margarethenwiese, Basel
15:00	Kohler 80' (1:1); Bürgin 85' (2:1)	Summary	20' (0:1) Albicker (I)	Attendance: 1,500; Referee: (Switzerland) Grunauer Basel

20 April 1919 Round 9	Étoile-Sporting	1–1	Basel	Parc des Sports, La Chaux-de-Fonds
14:05	Brönnimann 13' (1:0)	Summary	11' (1:1) Albicker (I)	Attendance: 2,000; Referee: (Switzerland) Thurnheer Heinrich Nidau

27 April 1919 Round 10	Basel	3–2	La Chaux-de-Fonds	Landhof, Basel
15:00	Kuhn 10' (pen. 1:0); Kaltenbach (2:2); Wüthrich 80' (3:2)	Summary	(1:1) Perrenoud; 65' (1:2) Daucourt	Attendance: 800; Referee: (Switzerland) Eugen Stutz Luzern

4 May 1919 Round 11	Aarau	0–3	Basel	Schachen Aarau
16:00		Summary	Goal

29 May 1919 Round 12	Biel-Bienne	0–3 FF	Basel	Biel
		Summary
Note: Reason for forfeit unknown

1 June 1919 Round 13	Basel	1–1	Luzern	Landhof, Basel
15:00	Kaltenbach (1:1)	Summary	(0:1)	Referee: (Switzerland) Schenker Basel

15 June 1919 Round 14	Basel	1–2	Aarau	Landhof, Basel
15:00	Wüthrich 50' (1:1)	Summary	20' (0:1) (1:2)

==== Central Group league table ====
Pos	Team	Pld	W	D	L	GF	GA	GD	Pts	Qualification
1	Étoile-Sporting	14	11	2	1	42	9	+33	24	Advance to finals
2	Old Boys	14	8	3	3	31	18	+13	19	
3	Nordstern Basel	14	8	3	3	23	15	+8	19	
4	La Chaux-de-Fonds	14	8	3	3	32	23	+9	19	
5	Basel	14	5	3	6	27	26	+1	13	
6	Aarau	14	5	1	8	13	24	−11	11	
7	Luzern	14	2	3	9	18	27	−9	7	
8	Biel-Bienne	14	0	0	14	2	46	−44	0	

Source: rsssf.com

== See also ==
- History of FC Basel
- List of FC Basel players
- List of FC Basel seasons

== Sources ==
- Rotblau: Jahrbuch Saison 2014/2015. Publisher: FC Basel Marketing AG. ISBN 978-3-7245-2027-6
- Die ersten 125 Jahre. Publisher: Josef Zindel im Friedrich Reinhardt Verlag, Basel. ISBN 978-3-7245-2305-5
- FCB team 1918–19 at fcb-archiv.ch
- Switzerland 1918-19 at RSSSF
