= 1917–18 FC Basel season =

FC Basel
1917–18 season
- Chairman: Franz Rinderer
- First team coach: Ernst Kaltenbach (as team captain)
- Ground: Landhof, Basel
- Serie A: Group Stage: Second
- Top goalscorer: League: Otto Kuhn (4); Karl Wüthrich (4); All: Karl Wüthrich (13)
- Average home league attendance: n/a

The FC Basel 1917–18 season was their twentyfifth season since the club's foundation on 15 November 1893. FC Basel played their home games in the Landhof in the district Wettstein in Kleinbasel. The club's chairman was Franz Rinderer and in 1917 he was elected as president of the Swiss Football Association.

== Overview ==
Before the first World War came to an end, over 420,000 square meters of the total of 920,000 square meters of Swiss footballs field had been converted into potato fields. In 1913 FCB founded an athletics section, in 1915 their youth football section, Therefore, the club fought hard to keep their ground Landhof. In 1917 the club organised the Swiss athletic championships in their grounds. The first nine championships, in the years 1906 to 1916 (1914–15 was canceled) were all held in French-speaking Switzerland. 1917 was the first time that the championships were held in the German-speaking region. The event was a success, 17 clubs and over 100 athletics took part and it attracted about 4,000 spectators.

The football team played a total of 23 matches in the 1917–18 season. 12 of these were in the domestic league and 10 were friendly matches. Of these friendlies six were won, one was drawn and three ended in a defeat. There were six home fixtures played in the Landhof and three away games. Three of these games were played in the Basel championship against the two other local teams Old Boys and Nordstern Basel. The away game in the Basel championship against the Old Boys was postponed and awarded 3–0 to the opponents.

The domestic league, Swiss Serie A 1917–18, was divided into three regional groups, an east, a central and a west. Basel and the two other local teams were allocated to the central group which had just seven teams, as opposed to the other two groups which both had eight teams. Baden could not participate because their field was used for agricultural purposes due to the war. The other teams playing in the Central group were FC Bern, Young Boys Bern, Biel-Bienne and Aarau. Basel played a good season, suffering only two defeats. They ended the season in second position with 17 points. In their 12 games Basel scored 31 goals and conceded 19. Karl Wüthrich and Otto Kuhn were jointly the team's best goal scorers both netting four times. Looking at things from the local point of view, Basel took three point from the two games against Nordstern Basel and won both of their games against Old Boys.

The Old Boys were in last position in the central group league table, but during the period of World War I there was not relegation/promotion between the Serie A and Serie B. The Young Boys won the group and continued to the finals. In the finals YB beat St. Gallen 2–1 but were defeated 2–4 by Servette, who thus won the Swiss championship.

== Players ==
Squad members

Note: Flags indicate national team as defined under FIFA eligibility rules; some limited exceptions apply. Players may hold more than one non-FIFA nationality.

No.	Pos.	Nation	Player
—	GK	SUI	Arthur Fahr
—	GK	SUI	Emil Fehr
—	DF	SUI	Paul Bettex
—	DF	SUI	Emil Ganter
—	DF	SUI	Hermann Moll
—	DF	SUI	Peter Riesterer
—	DF	SUI	Anton Rittel (I)
—	MF		Charles Bouwmeester
—	MF	SUI	Emil Hasler
—	MF	SUI	Ernst Kaltenbach
—	MF	SUI	Jakob Känzig
—	MF	SUI	Otto Kuhn
—	MF	SUI	Fritz Raas
—	MF	SUI	Walter Rupprecht

No.	Pos.	Nation	Player
—	FW	SUI	Christian Albicker (I)
—	FW	SUI	Karl Bielser
—	FW		Rudolf Bredschneider
—	FW		Gustav Buser
—	FW	SUI	Wilhelm Dietz (I)
—	FW	SUI	Ernst Rittel (II)
—	FW	SUI	Karl Rudin
—	FW	SUI	Carl Schloz
—	FW	SUI	Karl Wüthrich
—	FW		Valentin von der Mühll
—			Borer
—			S.A. Campiche
—		SUI	Jules Lotter
—			Rooser

== Results ==
Legend

Win Draw Loss Postponed and forfeit

=== Friendly matches ===
==== Pre- and mid-season ====
2 September 1917 Pre-season	Étoile-Sporting (Switzerland)	6–4	(Switzerland) Basel	Stade du FC Etoile, La Chaux-de-Fonds
14:30	Meroz (1:2) (2:3) (3:3) (4:4) (5:4) (6:4)	Summary	5' (0:1) Kuhn (0:2) Wüthrich (1:3) Kuhn (3:4) Kaltenbach	Referee: (Switzerland) Sommer

9 September 1917 Pre-season	Servette (Switzerland)	6–1	(Switzerland) Basel	Parc des Sports, Genf
14:30	Beyner 18' (1:0); Bédouret (2:1); Pasche (3:1); Pasche (4:1); Pasche (5:1); Bédouret (6:1)	Summary	(1:1) Kuhn	Referee: (Switzerland) Ryser

14 October 1917 Mid-season	Basel (Switzerland)	3–0	(Switzerland) Old Boys	Landhof, Basel
	Bouwmeester (1:0); Kaltenbach (2:0); Moll (3:0)	Summary		Referee: (Switzerland) A. Schmidt Basel

14 October 1917 Mid-season	Basel (Switzerland)	3–2	(Switzerland) Young Fellows Zürich	Landhof, Basel
	Hasler (1:1); Bouwmeester (2:1); Rupprecht (3:1)	Summary	(0:1) Leiber (3:2) Leiber	Referee: (Switzerland) A. Schmidt Basel

==== Second half of season ====
24 March 1918 Basel championship	Basel (Switzerland)	6–1	(Switzerland) Nordstern Basel	Landhof, Basel
15:00	Birbaum (o.g. 1:0); Wüthrich (2:0); Buser (3:0); Wüthrich (4:1); Kaltenbach (5:1); Wüthrich (6:1)	Summary	(3:1) Afflerbach	Attendance: 2,500; Referee: (Switzerland) D. Wenger Basel

1 April 1918 Mid-season	VFC Winterthur-Veltheim (Switzerland)	3–3	(Switzerland) Basel	Winterthur
	Goal	Summary	Goal

24 April 1918 Basel championship	Old Boys (Switzerland)	3–0 FF	(Switzerland) Basel
		Summary

24 April 1918 Mid-season	Basel (Switzerland)	5–1	(Switzerland) Servette	Landhof, Basel
15:00	Wüthrich (1:0); Albicker (I) (2:0); Wüthrich (3:1); Buser (4:1); Wüthrich (5:1)	Summary	(2:1) Pache	Attendance: 2,000; Referee: (Switzerland) Louis Riesterer Basel

5 May 1918 Basel championship	Nordstern Basel (Switzerland)	2–1	(Switzerland) Basel	Margarethenwiese, Basel
15:00	Dietz (1:0) (2:1)	Summary	(1:1) Schloz	Referee: (Switzerland) Guido Eichenberger Bern

2 June 1918 Basel championship	Basel (Switzerland)	1–0	(Switzerland) Old Boys	Landhof, Basel
15:00	80' (1:0)	Summary		Referee: (Switzerland)

16 June 1918 End of season	Basel (Switzerland)	6–3	(Switzerland) 5th Division military team	Landhof, Basel
	Wüthrich (1:); Wüthrich (2:3); Buser (3:3); Bielser (4:3); Bielser (5:3); Bielser (6:3)	Summary	(1:1) Apter (1:2) (1:3)	Referee: (Switzerland)

=== Serie A ===
==== Central Group results ====
30 September 1917 Round 1	Basel	3–1	Biel-Bienne	Landhof, Basel
15:00	Buser (1:0); Schloz (2:0); Wüthrich (3:0)	Summary	(3:1) Borle	Attendance: 2,000; Referee: (Switzerland) Wieland Zürich

21 October 1917 Round 2	Young Boys	3–1	Basel	Spitalacker, Bern
14:30	Funk (I) (pen. 1:0); Klopfenstein (2:0); Dasen (I) (3:1)	Summary	(2:1) Albicker (I)	Attendance: 2,000; Referee: (Switzerland) Hermann Etzensberger La Chaux-de-Fonds

28 October 1917 Round 3	Basel	3–0	Old Boys	Landhof, Basel
15:15	Dietz (I) 5' (1:0); Hasler 25' (2:0); Hasler 39' (3:0)	Summary		Attendance: 1,500; Referee: (Switzerland) Pohlmann Zürich

18 November 1917 Round 4	Basel	1–4	Aarau	Landhof, Basel
15:00	Albicker (I) 40' (1:1)	Summary	38' (0:1) von Arx (pen. 1:2) Märki (1:3) Märki (1:4)	Attendance: 2,000; Referee: (Switzerland) E. Stutz Luzern

2 December 1917 Round 5	Nordstern Basel	0–2	Basel	Margarethenwiese, Basel
14:30		Summary	(o.g.) Schwegler (o.g.) Leder	Attendance: 1,200; Referee: (Switzerland) John Forster La Chaux-de-Fonds

9 December 1917 Round 6	FC Bern	1–3	Basel	Kirchenfeld, Bern
14:30	Brand (1:0)	[ Summary]	22' (1:1) Buser (1:2) Kuhn; 76' (1:3) Kuhn	Referee: (Switzerland) Hermann Etzensberger La Chaux-de-Fonds

20 January 1918 Round 7	Basel	2–2	Nordstern Basel	Landhof, Basel
14:30	Kuhn (1:2); Rudin (2:2)	Summary	10' (0:1) Bürgin (0:2) Hermann	Attendance: 1,000; Referee: (Switzerland) Wieland Zürich

3 February 1918 Round 8	Aarau	0–0	Basel	Scachen, Aarau
		Summary

10 February 1918 Round 9	Biel-Bienne	4–5	Basel	Gurzelen Stadion, Biel/Bienne
14:45	Börle (1:3); Keller (2:3); Marbot (3:4); Grupp (I) (4:5)	Summary	(0:1) Kaltenbach (0:2) Wüthrich (pen. 0:3) Riesterer (2:4) Rudin (o.g. 3:5) Suter

17 February 1918 Round 10	Basel	0–0	Young Boys	Landhof, Basel
15:00		Summary		Attendance: 3,000; Referee: (Switzerland) Reich Winterthur

3 March 1918 Round 11	Basel	8–3	FC Bern	Landhof, Basel
15:00	Kuhn (pen. 1:1); Wüthrich (2:1) von der Mühll (3:1) (4:1) (5:1) (6:1) (7:1) (8:3)	Summary	(0:1) Quinclet (7:2) (7:3)	Attendance: 800; Referee: (Switzerland) Fricker Zürich

17 March 1918 Round 12	Old Boys	1–3	Basel	Margarethenwiese, Basel
15:00	Saxer 10' (1:0)	Summary	20' (1:1) Rudin; 89' (1:2) Dietz (I); 90' (1:3) Wüthrich	Attendance: 2,000; Referee: (Switzerland) Lehmann Luzern

==== Central Group league table ====
Pos	Team	Pld	W	D	L	GF	GA	GD	Pts	Qualification
1	Young Boys	12	8	3	1	52	18	+34	19	Advance to finals
2	Basel	12	7	3	2	31	19	+12	17	
3	Aarau	12	7	2	3	24	16	+8	16	
4	FC Bern	12	4	4	4	21	26	−5	12	
5	Nordstern Basel	12	3	2	7	18	26	−8	8	
6	Biel-Bienne	12	4	0	8	24	36	−12	8	
7	Old Boys	12	2	0	10	21	50	−29	4	
8	Baden	0	0	0	0	0	0	0	0	Could not participate

Source: rsssf.com

NB: Baden could not participate because their field was used for agricultural purposes due to the war.

== See also ==
- History of FC Basel
- List of FC Basel players
- List of FC Basel seasons

== Sources ==
- Rotblau: Jahrbuch Saison 2014/2015. Publisher: FC Basel Marketing AG. ISBN 978-3-7245-2027-6
- Die ersten 125 Jahre. Publisher: Josef Zindel im Friedrich Reinhardt Verlag, Basel. ISBN 978-3-7245-2305-5
- FCB team 1916–17 at fcb-archiv.ch
- Switzerland 1917-18 at RSSSF
