= 1921–22 FC Basel season =

FC Basel
1921–22 season
- Chairman: Carl Burkhardt
- First team coach: Ernst Kaltenbach (as team captain)
- Ground: Landhof, Basel
- Serie A: Group Stage: 3rd
- Och Cup: Round 1
- Top goalscorer: League: Otto Kuhn (8); All: Otto Kuhn (10); Karl Wüthrich (10)
- Highest home attendance: n/a
- Lowest home attendance: n/a
- Average home league attendance: n/a

The FC Basel 1921–22 season was their twenty-ninth season since the club's foundation on 15 November 1893. The club's chairman was Carl Burkhardt who took over from Franz Rinderer at the club's AGM. FC Basel played their home games in the Landhof in the district Wettstein in Kleinbasel.

== Overview ==
Basel played a total of 28 matches in their 1921–22 season. 14 of these were in the domestic league, one in the Och Cup and 13 were friendly matches. Of these 13 friendlies, seven were home games played in the Landhof and six were away games. Basel played eight of their friendly games against German opponents. The pre-season match on 6 August was a challenge match for the Feldberg Cup. The game took place on an improvised football field (swamp, ditch and rocks). After an hour, the game was abandoned and the Cup awarded to the Freiburger FC by toss of a coin. During the winter break Basel made a short journey to Germany and played one game against the Würzburger Kickers and one in Frankfurt am Main against 1. FFC Germania 1894. On the 1 April they travelled to Hamburg and played SC Victoria. Basel were also hosts for Czech team Sparta Prague, Hungarian Újpesti Dózsa and French team Mulhouse. Four test games ended in a victory, four were drawn and five ended in a defeat. In these tests Basel scored a total of 26 goals and conceded 33.

The domestic league, Swiss Serie A 1921–22, was divided into three regional groups, East, Central and West, each group with eight teams. FC Basel and the two other teams from Basel Nordstern and Old Boys were allocated to the Central group. The other teams playing in this group were Aarau, Luzern and Biel-Bienne and the two teams from the capital, Young Boys and FC Bern. FC Basel played a mediocre season, 14 matches, winning six matches, drawing three and suffering five defeats, scoring 20 goals and conceding 21. With 15 points they ended the season in third position. Kuhn was the team's top league goal scorer with 8 goals. In the home game against Luzern on 27 November 1921 he managed a hattrick. Despite this Luzern won the group and continued to the finals. Servette won the championship.

In the first round of the Och Cup, that had been newly created the year before, and is considered as the forerunner to the Swiss Cup, Basel played an away game against lower tier FC Olten. Basel lost 4–0 and were eliminated. The final was played on 6 August 1922 between Basel's lower tier rivals Concordia Basel and Étoile-Sporting. Concordia won 1–0 to win the trophy.

== Players ==
Squad members

Note: Flags indicate national team as defined under FIFA eligibility rules; some limited exceptions apply. Players may hold more than one non-FIFA nationality.

No.	Pos.	Nation	Player
—	GK	SUI	Ernst Boser
—	GK	SUI	Arthur Fahr
—	GK	SUI	Ernst Zorzotti (III)
—	DF	AUT	Gustav Putzendopler (I)
—	DF	SUI	Peter Riesterer
—	MF	SUI	Walter Rupprecht
—	MF	SUI	Max Galler (II)
—	MF	SUI	Emil Hasler
—	MF	SUI	Ernst Kaltenbach
—	MF	SUI	Jakob Känzig
—	MF	SUI	Otto Kuhn
—	MF	AUT	Karl Putzendopler (II)
—	FW	SUI	Karl Bielser
—	FW	SUI	Fritz Bucco
—	FW	SUI	Walter Dietrich

No.	Pos.	Nation	Player
—	FW	SUI	Paul Dietz (II)
—	FW	SUI	Jules Düblin
—	FW	SUI	Walter Galler (I)
—	FW		Willy Geiser
—	FW	SUI	Gottlieb Häusselmann
—	FW	SUI	Karl Ibach
—	DF	SUI	Müller
—	FW	SUI	Hans Schneider
—	FW	SUI	Karl Wüthrich
—	FW	SUI	Franz Zeiser
—		SUI	Albert Albrecht
—			Bürgin
—			Wilhelm Flubacher (I)
—			Friedly
—			Schumacher

== Results ==
Legend

Win Draw Loss Postponed

=== Friendly matches ===
==== Pre-season and mid-season ====
unknown Pre-season	Basel (Switzerland)	2–2	(Germany) FV Lörrach	Landhof, Basel
	Goal	Summary	Goal

6 August 1921 Feldberg Cup	Freiburger FC (Germany)	1–1	(Switzerland) Basel	Feldbergerhof, Freiburg
12:00	Bantle (1:0)	Summary	(1:1) Zepf	Referee: (Switzerland) Ibach
Note: The game took place on an improvised football field (swamp, ditch and rocks). After an hour, the game was abandoned and the Feldberg Cup awarded to the Freiburger FC by toss of a coin.

27 August 1921 Pre-season	Freiburger FC (Germany)	1–1	(Switzerland) Basel	Freiburg
	Goal	Summary	Goal

11 September 1921 Pre-season	Basel (Switzerland)	2–6	(Czech Republic) AC Sparta Prague	Landhof, Basel
15:00	Bielser (1:3); Dietz (II) (2:3)	Summary	20' (0:1) (o.g. 0:2) Riesterer (0:3) Pilat (2:4) (2:5) Tanda (2:6)	Attendance: 7,000; Referee: (Switzerland) Passera La Chaux-de-Fonds

30 October 1921 Mid-season	Basel (Switzerland)	2–3	(Switzerland) Blue Stars	Landhof, Basel
15:30	Wüthrich (pen. 1:1); Wüthrich (2:1)	Summary	(pen. 0:1) Kunz (2:2) Kunz (2:3) Tissy	Attendance: 3,000; Referee: (Switzerland) Schmid Basel

4 December 1921 Mid-season	Servette (Switzerland)	5–2	(Switzerland) Basel	Parc des Sports Genf
14:30	Pache (1:0); Pache (2:0); Bedouret (3:1); Barriere (4:1); Bedouret (5:2)	Summary	(2:1) (4:2) Düblin	Attendance: 1,500; Referee: (Switzerland) Epiney Genf

==== Winter break and mid-season ====
25 December 1921 Winter break	Würzburger Kickers (Germany)	0–2	(Switzerland) Basel	Sportplatz an der Randersackerer Strasse, Würzburg
		Summary	10' (0:1) Zeiser (0:2) Kuhn	Attendance: 3,000; Referee: (Germany)

26 December 1921 Winter break	1. FFC Germania 1894 (Germany)	1–1	(Switzerland) Basel	Frankfurt am Main
	Kuhn (o.g. 1:0)	Summary	(1:1) Fahr	Attendance: 2,000

8 January 1922 Winter break	Basel (Switzerland)	3–4	(Hungary) Újpesti Dózsa SC	Landhof, Basel
14:30	Fahr (1:0); Wüthrich (2:2); Putzendopler (II) (3:4)	Summary	(1:1) (1:2) (2:3) Priboj (2:4) Izidon	Attendance: 500; Referee: (Germany) Falschlunger

26 February 1922 Mid-season	Grasshopper Club (Switzerland)	1–4	(Switzerland) Basel	Hardturm, Zürich
15:00	Frankenfeldt 25' (1:0)	Summary	(1:1) Kuhn (1:2) Putzendopler (II) (1:3) Fahr (1:4) Wüthrich	Attendance: 1,500; Referee: (Switzerland) Wieland Zürich

1 April 1922 Mid-season	SC Victoria Hamburg (Germany)	2–2	(Switzerland) Basel	Stadion Hoheluft, Hamburg
	Goal	Summary	Ibach; Känzig

23 April 1922 Mid-season	Basel (Switzerland)	3–1	(France) Mulhouse	Landhof, Basel
	Goal	Summary	Goal

3 June 1922 Mid-season	Basel (Switzerland)	2–1	(Germany) Würzburger Kickers	Landhof, Basel
17:00	Kaltenbach 35' (1:0); Wüthrich 61' (2:0)	Summary	68' (2:1) Lossen	Attendance: 900; Referee: (Switzerland) Schenker Basel

5 June 1922 Mid-season	Basel (Switzerland)	0–6	(Germany) Altonaer 93	Landhof, Basel
17:00		Summary	5' (0:1) Schulz (0:2) Schulz (0:3) Jäger (0:4) Jäger (0:5) (0:6) Ruffelse	Attendance: 1,200

=== Serie A ===
==== Central Group results ====
25 September 1921 Round 1	Biel-Bienne	1–1	Basel	Gurzelen Stadion, Biel/Bienne
	Kramer (I) (1:1)	Summary	(0:1) Kuhn	Attendance: 2,500; Referee: (Switzerland) Sandoz La Chaux-de-Fonds

2 October 1921 Round 2	Basel	2–3	Nordstern Basel	Landhof, Basel
15:00	Wüthrich (1:3); Kuhn (2:3)	Summary	5' (0:1) Rölle (0:2) Afflerbach (o.g. 0:3)	Attendance: 3,000; Referee: (Switzerland) Wieland Zürich

16 October 1921 Round 3	Aarau	2–1	Basel	Schachen, Aarau
	von Arx (II) 23' (1:0) von Arx (II) (2:0)	Summary	(2:1) Kuhn	Attendance: 1,000; Referee: (Switzerland) Blum Zürich

23 October 1921 Round 4	FC Bern	0–1	Basel	Kirchenfeld, Bern
15:00		Summary	13' (0:1) Wüthrich	Attendance: 1,000; Referee: (Switzerland) Epiney Epiney

20 November 1921 Round 5	Young Boys	1–1	Basel	Spitalacker, Bern
15:00	(1:0)	Summary	(1:1)	Attendance: 2,000; Referee: (Switzerland) Müller Winterthur

27 November 1921 Round 6	Basel	3–1	Luzern	Landhof, Basel
14:30	Kuhn (1:1); Kuhn (2:1); Kuhn (3:1)	Summary	(0:1) Schild; (red card) Gross (I)	Referee: (Switzerland) Acker Zürich

11 December 1921 Round 7	Basel	0–2	Old Boys	Landhof, Basel
14:30		Summary	18' (0:1) Merkt; 21' (0:2) Merkt	Attendance: 3,000; Referee: (Switzerland) Guido Eichenberger Bern

15 January 1922 Round 8	Nordstern Basel	0–1	Basel	Landhof, Basel
14:30		Summary	85' (0:1) Düblin	Attendance: 1,500; Referee: (Switzerland) Edm. Dizerens Lausanne

19 February 1922 Round 9	Basel	1–0	Biel-Bienne	Landhof, Basel
15:00	Wüthrich 32' (1:0)	Summary		Attendance: 2,000; Referee: (Switzerland) Guido Eichenberger Bern

12 March 1922 Round 10	Luzern	2–2	Basel	Tribschen, Luzern
	Sormani (1:2) (2:2)	Summary	Wüthrich (0:1); Putzendopler (I) (0:2)	Attendance: 2,500; Referee: (Switzerland) John Forster La Chaux-de-Fonds

19 March 1922 Round 11	Basel	2–1	Aarau	Landhof, Basel
15:00	Bucco (1:1); Fahr (2:1)	Summary	(0:1) von Arx	Attendance: 2,500; Referee: (Switzerland) Reich Winterthur

9 April 1922 Round 12	Basel	1–3	Young Boys	Landhof, Basel
15:00	Bielser (1:3)	Summary	10' (0:1) Dassen (0:2) Fässler (I) (0:3) Dassen	Attendance: 2,500; Referee: (Switzerland) Ruegg Thalwil

14 May 1922 Round 13	Old Boys	2–0	Basel	Landhof, Basel
15:00	Grunauer 67' (1:0); Katz (2:0)	Summary		Attendance: 2,500; Referee: (Switzerland) Hans Wüthrich Bern

25 May 1922 Round 14	Basel	4–3	FC Bern	Landhof, Basel
15:00	Putzendopler (I) 3' (1:0); Kuhn 12' (2:0); 18' (3:0); Wüthrich (4:1)	Summary	(3:1) Danner/Wenger (o.g. 4:2) Geiser (4:3) Schneebeli	Attendance: 500

==== Central Group table ====
Pos	Team	Pld	W	D	L	GF	GA	GD	Pts	Qualification
1	Luzern	14	8	4	2	26	19	+7	20	Advance to finals
2	Biel-Bienne	14	6	4	4	24	23	+1	16	
3	Basel	14	6	3	5	20	21	−1	15	
4	Young Boys	14	5	4	5	25	17	+8	14	
5	Nordstern Basel	14	6	2	6	18	22	−4	14	
6	FC Bern	14	5	2	7	22	21	+1	12	
7	FC Aarau	14	3	6	5	14	17	−3	12	
8	Old Boys	14	2	5	7	14	23	−9	9	To promotion/relegation play-off

Source: rsssf.com

=== Och Cup ===
22 January 1922 Round 1	FC Olten	4–0	Basel	Wylerweg, Olten
14:30	Doppler (pen. 1:0); Hunziker 28' (2:0); Doppler (3:0); Doppler (4:0)	Summary		Attendance: 700; Referee: (Switzerland) Keller Luzern

== See also ==
- History of FC Basel
- List of FC Basel players
- List of FC Basel seasons

== Sources ==
- Rotblau: Jahrbuch Saison 2014/2015. Publisher: FC Basel Marketing AG. ISBN 978-3-7245-2027-6
- Die ersten 125 Jahre. Publisher: Josef Zindel im Friedrich Reinhardt Verlag, Basel. ISBN 978-3-7245-2305-5
- FCB squad 1921–22 at fcb-archiv.ch

(NB: Despite all efforts, the editors of these books and the authors in "Basler Fussballarchiv" have failed to be able to identify all the players, their date and place of birth or date and place of death, who played in the games during the early years of FC Basel.)

- Switzerland 1921-22 at RSSSF
