= List of FC Basel seasons =

This is a list of seasons played by FC Basel in Swiss and European football, from the club's founding in 1893 to the present. It details FC Basel's record in each major competition entered including different divisions of the Swiss Football League, the Swiss Cup, the Swiss League Cup, the Inter-Cities Fairs Cup, and various UEFA competitions. Although the first season of Swiss football occurred in 1897–98, FC Basel did not take part until the following season in 1898–99. The club did not compete the next season, but has participated in every season since 1900–01. The club won its first major trophy in 1932–33, when it won the Swiss Cup, and its first Swiss league title in 1952–53. To date, FC Basel have won 21 league titles, 14 Swiss Cups, and 1 Swiss League Cup.

== League names ==
From its inception in the 1897–98 season to the 1932–33 season, the Swiss Championship (known originally as "Serie A", then "1st League", then "Nationalliga") consisted of teams playing in regional groups, followed by either a play-off match of the top 2 teams, or a championship play-off group involving the top several teams. The 1932–33 season also contained an intermediate championship called the "Challenge National" where the teams in each of the 2 groups played the teams in the other group, followed by a play-off match between the group winners. In 1933–34, the different regional groups were combined into a single league to determine the championship, and this league format has been maintained until the present. However, it was not until the 1944–45 season that the 2nd division of Swiss football was similarly organised, with the adoption of the names "Nationalliga A" and "Nationalliga B" for the top 2 divisions. Since 2003–04 these divisions have been known as the "Swiss Super League" and the "Swiss Challenge League" respectively.

== Seasons ==
Season	League									Swiss Cup	Swiss League Cup	Europe	Top scorer(s)	
Season	Division	Pld	W	D	L	GF	GA	Pts	Pos	Swiss Cup	Swiss League Cup	Europe	Player(s)	Goals
1893–94	FC Basel did not play competitive football													
1894–95	FC Basel did not play competitive football													
1895–96	FC Basel did not play competitive football													
1896–97	FC Basel did not play competitive football													
1897–98	FC Basel did not play competitive football													
1898–99	Serie A Central	2	0	1	1	2	3	n/a	2nd					
1899–1900	FC Basel did not play competitive football													
1900–01	Serie A East	10	2	2	6	21	35	6	5th					
1901–02	Serie A Central	7	5	0	2	15	7	10	2nd					
1902–03	Serie A Central	8	3	0	5	13	20	6	3rd					
1903–04	Serie A Central	10	5	2	3	28	25	12	3rd					
1904–05	Serie A Central	8	2	0	6	18	20	4	4th					
1905–06	Serie A Central	6	2	0	4	11	17	4	4th					
1906–07	Serie A Central	8	5	0	3	30	20	10	1st					
1906–07	Serie A Final	2	0	0	2	3	0	8	3rd					
1907–08	Serie A East	14	6	2	6	40	39	14	3rd					
1908–09	Serie A East	14	4	3	7	39	57	11	6th					
1909–10	Serie A Central	10	4	2	4	24	24	10	5th					
1910–11	Serie A Central	12	5	1	6	32	36	11	3rd					
1911–12	Serie A Central	14	5	2	7	30	34	12	5th					
1912–13	Serie A Central	14	7	2	5	46	30	16	4th				n/a	
1913–14	Serie A Central	14	9	1	4	63	33	19	2nd				Christian Albicker	12
1914–15	Serie A Central A	6	2	1	3	15	14	5	3rd				Emil Hasler	7
1915–16	Serie A Central	14	4	1	9	30	39	9	7th				Otto Kuhn; Emil Hasler	7
1916–17	Serie A Central	15	5	5	2	31	20	15	2nd				Karl Wüthrich	6
1917–18	Serie A Central	12	7	3	2	31	19	17	2nd				Otto Kuhn; Karl Wüthrich	4
1918–19	Serie A Central	14	5	3	6	27	26	13	5th				Otto Kuhn	6
1919–20	Serie A Central	14	7	4	3	32	20	18	2nd				Karl Wüthrich	9
1920–21	Serie A Central	15	3	2	10	20	29	8	7th				Karl Wüthrich	8
1921–22	Serie A Central	14	6	3	5	20	21	15	3rd				Otto Kuhn	8
1922–23	Serie A Central	14	6	3	5	17	22	15	4th				Otto Kuhn	4
1923–24	Serie A Central	16	8	2	6	16	15	18	3rd				Otto Kuhn	4
1924–25	Serie A Central	16	7	5	4	15	13	19	4th				Emil Breh	7
1925–26	Serie A Central	16	7	6	3	26	14	20	2nd	Round 2			Arnold Hürzeler	8
1926–27	Serie A Central	16	8	3	5	29	26	19	4th	Round 1			Emil Arlt	12
1927–28	Serie A Central	16	10	1	5	27	21	21	3rd	Round 1			Karl Wüthrich	8
1928–29	Serie A Central	16	8	4	4	48	32	20	2nd	Round 2			Karl Bielser	15
1929–30	Serie A Central	16	10	4	2	51	18	22	1st	Round 3			Alfred Schlecht	13
1929–30	Serie A Final	4	1	0	3	2	8	2	4th	Round 3			Alfred Schlecht	13
1930–31	Serie A Central	18	11	2	5	48	28	24	2nd	Round 1			Leopold Kielholz	19
1930–31	Serie A Final	4	1	1	2	7	11	3	5th	Round 1			Leopold Kielholz	19
1931–32	Nationalliga Group 1	16	7	1	8	35	48	15	7th	Semi-finals			Otto Haftl	11
1932–33	Challenge National	7	3	2	2	42	29	8	5th	Winners			Otto Haftl	21
1932–33	Nationalliga Group 1	14	7	4	3	42	29	18	2nd	Winners			Otto Haftl	21
1933–34	Nationalliga	30	15	6	9	89	64	36	5th	Quarter-finals			Otto Haftl	28
1934–35	Nationalliga	26	12	4	10	61	50	28	5th	Semi-finals			Otto Haftl	21
1935–36	Nationalliga	26	8	4	14	51	59	20	10th	Round 1			Josef Artimovicz	14
1936–37	Nationalliga	24	8	4	12	30	42	20	11th	Round 1			Guglielmo Spadini	10
1937–38	Nationalliga	22	12	3	7	48	31	27	4th	Round 3			Numa Monnard	28
1938–39	Nationalliga	22	5	5	12	29	36	15	12th	Round 5			Eduard Buser	11
1939–40	1st League Group 3	12	9	2	1	38	16	20	1st	Round 4			August Ibach	20
1939–40	1st League title play-off	6	4	1	1	14	10	n/a	1st	Round 4			August Ibach	20
1940–41	1st League Central	14	11	2	1	44	19	24	1st	Round 4			August Ibach	15
1940–41	1st League play-off	2	0	1	1	2	3	1	3rd	Round 4			August Ibach	15
1941–42	1st League East	22	18	3	1	77	15	39	1st	Runners-up			Hermann Suter	17
1941–42	1st League play-off	2	1	1	0	3	1	n/a	1st	Runners-up			Hermann Suter	17
1942–43	Nationalliga	26	7	4	15	29	57	18	13th	Quarter-finals			Hermann Suter	11
1943–44	Nationalliga	26	9	8	9	42	38	26	9th	Runners-up			Alfred Weisshaar	18
1944–45	Nationalliga A	26	6	6	14	45	59	18	13th	Round 5			René Bader	14
1945–46	Nationalliga B	26	19	5	2	87	21	43	1st	Round 5			René Bader	31
1946–47	Nationalliga A	26	12	5	9	60	45	29	4th	Winners			Traugott Oberer	16
1947–48	Nationalliga A	26	7	10	9	44	51	24	10th	Quarter-finals			Paul Stöcklin; Traugott Oberer	11
1948–49	Nationalliga A	26	13	7	6	58	37	33	2nd	Round 5			Hans Hügi (I)	14
1949–50	Nationalliga A	26	14	5	7	48	40	33	2nd	Semi-finals			Gottlieb Stäuble	15
1950–51	Nationalliga A	26	12	4	10	62	51	28	4th	Round 5			Josef Hügi (II)	23
1951–52	Nationalliga A	26	14	3	9	68	47	31	4th	Semi-finals			Josef Hügi (II)	32
1952–53	Nationalliga A	26	17	8	1	72	38	42	1st	Quarter-finals			Josef Hügi (II)	38
1953–54	Nationalliga A	26	11	2	13	55	62	24	8th	Round 4			Josef Hügi (II)	30
1954–55	Nationalliga A	26	10	4	12	47	52	24	9th	Round 5			Josef Hügi (II)	23
1955–56	Nationalliga A	26	10	6	10	47	50	26	7th	Quarter-finals		Fairs Cup – GS	Josef Hügi (II)	18
1956–57	Nationalliga A	26	15	4	7	53	38	34	4th	Round 4		Fairs Cup – GS	Josef Hügi (II)	23
1957–58	Nationalliga A	26	9	6	11	59	53	24	9th	Round 4		Fairs Cup – GS	Josef Hügi (II)	18
1958–59	Nationalliga A	26	11	5	10	54	48	27	6th	Round 4		Fairs Cup – R1	Josef Hügi (II); Gottlieb Stäuble	14
1959–60	Nationalliga A	26	6	10	10	46	55	22	10th	Round 5		Fairs Cup – R1	Josef Hügi (II)	19
1960–61	Nationalliga A	26	13	2	11	42	36	28	5th	Round 3		Fairs Cup – R1	Josef Hügi (II)	17
1961–62	Nationalliga A	26	10	8	8	51	54	28	7th	Quarter-finals		Fairs Cup – R1	Josef Hügi (II)	15
1962–63	Nationalliga A	26	10	6	10	59	51	26	6th	Winners		Fairs Cup – R1	Heinz Blumer	20
1963–64	Nationalliga A	26	10	6	10	42	48	26	7th	Round 5		Cup Winners' Cup – Prelim	Karl Odermatt	11
1964–65	Nationalliga A	26	11	5	10	44	54	27	8th	Semi-finals		Fairs Cup – R2	Roberto Frigerio	21
1965–66	Nationalliga A	26	10	7	9	64	57	27	6th	Semi-finals		Fairs Cup – R2	Roberto Frigerio	22
1966–67	Nationalliga A	26	16	8	2	61	20	40	1st	Winners		Fairs Cup – R1	Roberto Frigerio	23
1967–68	Nationalliga A	26	13	5	8	49	33	31	5th	Round 5		European Cup – R1	Helmut Hauser	12
1968–69	Nationalliga A	26	13	10	3	48	28	36	1st	Quarter-finals		Fairs Cup – R1	Helmut Hauser	15
1969–70	Nationalliga A	26	15	7	4	59	23	37	1st	Runners-up		European Cup – R1	Helmut Hauser	24
1970–71	Nationalliga A	26	18	6	2	67	26	42	2nd	Quarter-finals		European Cup – R2	Karl Odermatt	16
1971–72	Nationalliga A	26	18	7	1	66	28	43	1st	Runners-up		UEFA Cup – R1	Ottmar Hitzfeld	19
1972–73	Nationalliga A	26	17	5	4	57	30	39	1st	Runners-up	Winners	European Cup – R1	Ottmar Hitzfeld	19
1973–74	Nationalliga A	26	13	3	10	57	39	29	5th	Quarter-finals	Round 1	European Cup – QF	Ottmar Hitzfeld	25
1974–75	Nationalliga A	26	11	9	6	49	33	31	4th	Winners	Semi-finals		Ottmar Hitzfeld	21
1975–76	Nationalliga A	26	13	8	5	59	38	34	3rd	Round 5	Semi-finals	Cup Winners' Cup – R1	Roland Schönenberger; Peter Marti	14
1976–77	Nationalliga A Qualifying	22	14	5	3	54	30	33	2nd	Round 5	Round 2	UEFA Cup – R2	Erni Maissen	12
1976–77	Nationalliga A Playoff	10	5	2	3	19	16	29	1st	Round 5	Round 2	UEFA Cup – R2	Erni Maissen	12
1977–78	Nationalliga A Qualifying	22	12	4	6	53	34	28	4th	Semi-finals	Semi-finals	European Cup – R1	Roland Schönenberger	24
1977–78	Nationalliga A Playoff	10	5	3	2	21	14	27	3rd	Semi-finals	Semi-finals	European Cup – R1	Roland Schönenberger	24
1978–79	Nationalliga A Qualifying	22	10	6	6	36	29	26	4th	Quarter-finals	Runners-up	UEFA Cup – R1	Detlev Lauscher	22
1978–79	Nationalliga A Final	10	2	1	7	18	24	18	6th	Quarter-finals	Runners-up	UEFA Cup – R1	Detlev Lauscher	22
1979–80	Nationalliga A Qualifying	26	15	7	4	67	27	37	2nd	Round 5	Round 1		Joseph Küttel	19
1979–80	Nationalliga A Playoff	10	6	2	2	24	11	33	1st	Round 5	Round 1		Joseph Küttel	19
1980–81	Nationalliga A	26	9	10	7	48	44	28	6th	Quarter-finals	Round 1	European Cup – R2	Erni Maissen	14
1981–82	Nationalliga A	30	11	6	13	47	51	28	8th	Runners-up	Quarter-finals		Erni Maissen	13
1982–83	Nationalliga A	30	10	5	15	47	56	25	11th	Round 5				
1983–84	Nationalliga A	30	11	6	13	55	59	28	9th	Round 4				
1984–85	Nationalliga A	30	11	9	10	46	49	31	8th	Round 5				
1985–86	Nationalliga A	30	10	10	10	44	40	30	10th	Semi-finals				
1986–87	Nationalliga A	30	9	6	15	49	62	24	12th	Round 5				
1986–87	Relegation/Promotion play-offs	4	1	2	1	12	6	n/a	n/a	Round 5				
1987–88	Nationalliga A Qualifying	22	4	5	13	27	55	13	11th	Round 3				
1987–88	Promotion/relegation group A	14	5	4	5	27	20	14	5th	Round 3				
1988–89	Nationalliga B Qualifying East	22	14	4	4	48	23	32	1st	Quarter-finals				
1988–89	Promotion/relegation group A	14	4	6	4	19	21	14	4th	Quarter-finals				
1989–90	Nationalliga B Qualifying West	22	11	5	6	40	29	27	5th	Quarter-finals				
1989–90	Promotion/relegation group A	14	6	5	3	27	17	17	3rd	Quarter-finals				
1990–91	Nationalliga B Qualifying South East	22	9	8	5	40	30	26	4th	Round 2				
1990–91	Promotion/relegation group A	14	4	4	6	18	17	12	4th	Round 2				
1991–92	Nationalliga B Qualifying West	22	13	5	4	42	30	31	1st	Quarter-finals				
1991–92	Promotion/relegation group A	14	4	6	4	20	22	14	4th	Quarter-finals				
1992–93	Nationalliga B Qualifying West	22	16	4	2	54	10	36	2nd	Quarter-finals				
1992–93	Promotion/relegation group A	14	7	4	3	25	17	18	4th	Quarter-finals				
1993–94	Nationalliga B Qualifying West	18	12	1	5	39	14	25	2nd	Semi-finals				
1993–94	Promotion/relegation group	14	7	6	1	22	7	20	1st	Semi-finals				
1994–95	Nationalliga A Qualifying	22	6	8	8	18	15	20	7th	Round 5				
1994–95	Nationalliga A Champions Group	14	7	0	7	20	19	24	7th	Round 5				
1995–96	Nationalliga A Qualifying	22	9	3	10	23	29	30	5th	Quarter-finals			Alexandre Rey	17
1995–96	Nationalliga A Champions Group	14	3	4	7	14	20	28	6th	Quarter-finals			Alexandre Rey	17
1996–97	Nationalliga A Qualifying	22	5	10	7	32	33	25	8th	Round 5		Intertoto Cup – GS	Gaetano Giallanza	19
1996–97	Nationalliga A Champions Group	14	3	2	9	16	28	24	8th	Round 5		Intertoto Cup – GS	Gaetano Giallanza	19
1997–98	Nationalliga A Qualifying	22	5	4	13	28	46	19	11th	Round 6			Mario Frick	14
1997–98	Nationalliga A Promotion and relegation Group	14	6	4	4	27	22	22	3rd	Round 6			Mario Frick	14
1998–99	Nationalliga A Qualifying	22	8	4	10	21	34	28	6th	Round 5			Mario Frick	11
1998–99	Nationalliga A Championship Playoff	14	5	4	5	18	19	33	5th	Round 5			Mario Frick	11
1999–2000	Nationalliga A Qualifying	22	9	10	3	31	21	37	2nd	Quarter-finals		Intertoto Cup – R3	George Koumantarakis	24
1999–2000	Nationalliga A Champion Playoffs	14	5	6	3	16	16	40	3rd	Quarter-finals		Intertoto Cup – R3	George Koumantarakis	24
2000–01	Nationalliga A Qualifying	22	10	4	8	42	36	34	5th	Quarter-finals		UEFA Cup – R2	Jean-Michel Tchouga	20
2000–01	Nationalliga A Champion playoffs	14	4	8	2	18	16	37	4th	Quarter-finals		UEFA Cup – R2	Jean-Michel Tchouga	20
2001–02	Nationalliga A Qualifying	22	13	4	5	52	37	43	1st	Winners		Intertoto Cup – F	Christian Giménez	26
2001–02	Nationalliga A Champion playoffs	14	11	0	3	36	16	55	1st	Winners		Intertoto Cup – F	Christian Giménez	26
2002–03	Nationalliga A Qualifying	22	14	5	3	57	25	47	2nd	Winners		Champions League – GS2	Christian Giménez	20
2002–03	Nationalliga A Champion playoffs	14	10	2	2	38	17	56	2nd	Winners		Champions League – GS2	Christian Giménez	20
2003–04	Super League	36	26	7	3	86	32	85	1st	Round 3		UEFA Cup – R2	Christian Giménez	16
2004–05	Super League	34	21	7	6	81	45	70	1st	Round 3		Champions League – QR3	Christian Giménez	30
2004–05	Super League	34	21	7	6	81	45	70	1st	Round 3		UEFA Cup – Rof32	Christian Giménez	30
2005–06	Super League	36	23	9	4	87	42	78	2nd	Round 3		Champions League – QR3	Matías Emilio Delgado	29
2005–06	Super League	36	23	9	4	87	42	78	2nd	Round 3		UEFA Cup – QF	Matías Emilio Delgado	29
2006–07	Super League	36	22	8	6	77	40	74	2nd	Winners		UEFA Cup – GS	Mladen Petrić	26
2007–08	Super League	36	22	8	6	73	39	74	1st	Winners		UEFA Cup – Rof32	Marco Streller	17
2008–09	Super League	36	22	6	8	72	44	72	3rd	Semi-finals		Champions League – GS	Eren Derdiyok	14
2009–10	Super League	36	25	5	6	90	46	80	1st	Winners		Europa League – GS	Marco Streller	30
2010–11	Super League	36	21	10	5	76	44	73	1st	Quarter-finals		Champions League – GS	Alexander Frei	33
2010–11	Super League	36	21	10	5	76	44	73	1st	Quarter-finals		Europa League – Rof32	Alexander Frei	33
2011–12	Super League	34	22	8	4	78	32	71	1st	Winners		Champions League – Rof16	Alexander Frei	42
2012–13	Super League	36	21	9	6	61	31	72	1st	Runners-up		Champions League – POR	Marco Streller	21
2012–13	Super League	36	21	9	6	61	31	72	1st	Runners-up		Europa League – SF	Marco Streller	21
2013–14	Super League	36	19	15	2	70	34	72	1st	Runners-up		Champions League – GS	Marco Streller	19
2013–14	Super League	36	19	15	2	70	34	72	1st	Runners-up		Europa League – QF	Marco Streller	19
2014–15	Super League	36	24	6	6	84	41	78	1st	Runners-up		Champions League – Rof16	Shkëlzen Gashi	21
2015–16	Super League	36	26	5	5	88	38	83	1st	Quarter-finals		Champions League – POF	Marc Janko	16
2015–16	Super League	36	26	5	5	88	38	83	1st	Quarter-finals		Europa League – Rof16	Marc Janko	16
2016–17	Super League	36	26	8	2	92	35	86	1st	Winners		Champions League – GS	Seydou Doumbia	21
2017–18	Super League	36	20	9	7	72	36	69	2nd	Semi-finals		Champions League – Rof16	Albian Ajeti	14
2018–19	Super League	36	20	11	5	71	46	71	2nd	Winners		Champions League – QR2	Albian Ajeti	19
2018–19	Super League	36	20	11	5	71	46	71	2nd	Winners		Europa League – POF	Albian Ajeti	19
2019–20	Super League	36	18	8	10	74	38	62	3rd	Runners-up		Champions League – QR3	Arthur Cabral	18
2019–20	Super League	36	18	8	10	74	38	62	3rd	Runners-up		Europa League – QF	Arthur Cabral	18
2020–21	Super League	36	15	8	13	60	53	53	2nd	Round 3		Europa League – POF	Arthur Cabral	20
2021–22	Super League	36	15	17	4	70	41	62	2nd	Round 3		Europa Conference League – Rof16	Arthur Cabral	27
2022–23	Super League	36	11	14	11	51	50	57	5th	Quarter-finals		Europa Conference League – SF	Zeki Amdouni	22
2023–24	Super League	38	13	10	15	45	52	49	8th	Quarter-finals		Europa Conference League – QR2	Thierno Barry	12
2024–25	Super League	38	22	7	9	91	43	73	1st	Winners			Xherdan Shaqiri	20

== Key ==
- Pld = Matches played
- W = Matches won
- D = Matches drawn
- L = Matches lost
- GF = Goals for
- GA = Goals against
- Pts = Points
- Pos = Final position
- F = Finals
- GS = Group stage
- GS2 = Second group stage
- Prelim = Preliminary round
- POR = Play-off round
- QF = Quarter-finals
- QR1 = First qualifying round
- QR2 = Second qualifying round
- QR3 = Third qualifying round
- R1 = Round 1
- R2 = Round 2
- R3 = Round 3
- R4 = Round 4
- R5 = Round 5
- Rof32 = Round of 32
- Rof16 = Round of 16
- SF = Semi-finals

**Winners**^{†}	Runners-up	Promoted	Relegated

^{†}Text in bold italics indicates FC Basel was promoted in addition to being Champion of the division.
