= 1922–23 FC Basel season =

FC Basel
1922–23 season
- Chairman: Karl Ibach
- First team coach: Max Breunig
- Ground: Landhof, Basel
- Serie A: Group Stage: 4th
- Top goalscorer: League: Otto Kuhn (4); All: Otto Kuhn (11)
- Highest home attendance: 4,000 on 4 February 1923 vs FC Bern
- Lowest home attendance: 1,000 on 4 March 1923 vs Aarau
- Average home league attendance: 2,666

The FC Basel 1922–23 season was their thirtieth season since the club's foundation on 15 November 1893. The club's chairman was Karl Ibach. It was his second period as chairman. At the AGM he took over the presidency from Carl Burkhardt. FC Basel played their home games in the Landhof in the district Wettstein in Kleinbasel.

== Overview ==
For the beginning of this season the club hired the ex German international Max Breunig as trainer. He came from Karlsruher FV where he had been trainer for two seasons. Basel played a total of 32 matches in this season. 14 of these were in the domestic league and 18 were friendly matches. Of these 18 friendlies, six were home games played in the Landhof and 12 were away games. Nine test games ended in a victory, four were drawn and five ended in a defeat. In these tests Basel scored a total of 45 goals and conceded 28. Of these 18 friendlies, seven were during the winter break and one was a mid season game eight were played after the domestic league season had been completed.

After just two pre-season friendlies Basel started in the 1921–22 Swiss Serie A. The domestic league was again divided into three regional groups, East, Central and West, each group with eight teams. FC Basel and the two other teams from Basel Nordstern and Old Boys were allocated to the Central group. The other teams playing in this group were Aarau, Luzern and Biel-Bienne and the two teams from the capital, Young Boys Bern and FC Bern. FC Basel played a mediocre season, winning six matches, drawing three and suffering five defeats, scoring 17 goals and conceding 22. With 15 points they ended the season in fourth position. Otto Kuhn was the team's top league goal scorer with four goals.

An outrage and scandal after the 8th round match at the Landhof on 12 November 1922 against BSC Young Boys. It came to some massive disagreements between Basel manager Breunig's co-trainer Mr Sutter, the players of both teams and some fans. The Swiss Football Association started an enquiry immediately and postponed the match Basel against Luzern from 3 December 1922 to 18 February the following year. After an appeal the results of the enquiry ended with following decision: The club Basel was fined 200 Swiss Francs, co-trainer Mr Sutter was banned for three years, Basel's player Gustav Putzendopler was banned for six months, Young Boy's players Osterwalder and von Arx were both fined 20 Swiss Francs, Referee Josef Wieland received a life long ban for the top tier of Swiss football. The club Basel had to pay the costs of the court and it was decided that the team had to play two games behind closed doors. Because Basel won the appeal they did not have to play two matches without supporters, but the fine remained unchanged.

Another outrage and scandal was that the team Young Boys sportingly ended the season as Central group winners. But before the start of the championship play-offs, the qualification match FC Biel-Bienne versus FC Bern (the game had ended 3–1) from 25.02.1923 was awarded 0–3 due to ineligible players of FC Biel-Bienne. So both Young Boys Bern and FC Bern were level with 22 points and consequently a play-off was to be held for the regional championship. Young Boys withdrew from this match. Thus FC Bern continued to the finals, which they won. After the play-offs finals had been completed, the qualification match Basel versus FC Bern (the game had ended 0–4) from 04.02.1923 was awarded 3–0 forfait because FC Bern had played an ineligible player. After this decision Young Boys were again winners of the regional group. The date of this decision was in September 1923 and there was not enough time left for a new Play-off Final before the next season started. Therefore no Swiss championship was awarded for 1922/23 season.

== Players ==
Squad members

Note: Flags indicate national team as defined under FIFA eligibility rules; some limited exceptions apply. Players may hold more than one non-FIFA nationality.

No.	Pos.	Nation	Player
—	GK	SUI	Arthur Fahr
—	GK	SUI	Theodor Schär
—	DF	SUI	Hasler (II)
—	DF	SUI	Hermann Moll
—	DF	AUT	Gustav Putzendopler (I)
—	DF	SUI	Peter Riesterer
—	MF	SUI	Walter Rupprecht
—	MF	SUI	Max Galler (II)
—	MF	SUI	Ernst Kaltenbach
—	MF	SUI	Otto Kuhn
—	MF	AUT	Karl Putzendopler (II)
—	MF	SUI	Karl Wangler
—	FW	SUI	Karl Bielser

No.	Pos.	Nation	Player
—	FW	SUI	Gaetano Dal Ben
—	FW	SUI	Paul Dietz (II)
—	FW	SUI	Jules Düblin
—	FW		Willy Geiser
—	FW	SUI	Karl Ibach
—	FW	SUI	Müller
—	FW	SUI	Hans Rau
—	FW	SUI	Alfred Schlecht
—	FW	SUI	Fritz Schneider (I)
—	FW	SUI	Karl Wüthrich
—	FW	SUI	Franz Zeiser
—		SUI	Wilhelm Flubacher (I)
—		SUI	Hans Schneider (II)

== Results ==
Legend

Win Draw Loss Postponed

=== Friendly matches ===
==== Pre-season ====
3 September 1922 Pre-season	1. FC Pforzheim (Germany)	0–0	(Switzerland) Basel	Pforzheim
		Summary

10 September 1922 Pre-season	Blue Stars Zürich (Switzerland)	0–2	(Switzerland) Basel	Zürich
		Summary	25' (0:1) Wüthrich; 89' (0:2) Kuhn	Referee: (Switzerland) Acker Zürich

==== Winter break to end of season ====
24 December 1922 Winter break	US Alessandria (Italy)	5–3	(Switzerland) Basel	Alessandria
	Goal	Summary	Goal

28 December 1922 Winter break	US Valenzana (Italy)	2–1	(Switzerland) Basel	Valenzana
	Goal	Summary	Goal

26 December 1922 Winter break	US Biellese (Italy)	1–2	(Switzerland) Basel	Biella
	Goal	Summary	Goal

31 December 1922 Winter break	Vgt FC Schaffhausen-Sparta (Switzerland)	0–1	(Switzerland) Basel	Schaffhausen
		Summary	86' (0:1) Schneider (I)	Attendance: 800

1 January 1922 Winter break	Basel (Switzerland)	3–1	(Germany) Bayern München	Landhof, Basel
14:30	Wüthrich (1:0); Fahr (2:0); Kuhn (3:0)	Summary	(3:1)	Attendance: 2,000; Referee: (Switzerland) Felix Herren Basel

7 January 1923 Winter break	Basel (Switzerland)	4–2	(France) AS Strasbourg	Landhof, Basel
14:30	Kuhn (1:1); Fahr (2:2) (o.g. 2:3); Fahr (4:2)	Summary	(0:1) Bloch (1:2)	Attendance: 1,500; Referee: (Switzerland) Jacques Hirrle Basel

14 January 1923 Winter break	Zürich (Switzerland)	1–8	(Switzerland) Basel	Heiligfeld, Zürich
13:45	(o.g. 1:4)	Summary	20' (0:1) Fahr (0:2) Kuhn (0:3) Fahr (0:4) Wüthrich (1:5) Kuhn (1:6) Kuhn (1:7) Wüthrich (1:8) Schneider (I)	Attendance: 2,500; Referee: (Switzerland)

11 February 1923 Mid-season	FC Breite Basel (Switzerland)	1–3	(Switzerland) Basel	Basel
	Goal	Summary	Goal

31 March 1923 End of season	Basel (Switzerland)	1–1	(Germany) 1860 München	Landhof, Basel
16:30	(1:1)	Summary	(0:1) Grimm	Attendance: D Referee: (Switzerland) Jacques Hirrle Basel

8 April 1923 End of season	Lugano (Switzerland)	2–2	(Switzerland) Basel	Campo Marzio, Lugano
	Vicari (II) (1:0); Vicari (II) (2:0)	Summary	(2:1) Schlecht; 85' (o.g. 2:2)	Referee: (Switzerland) Sadis

15 April 1923 End of season	Basel (Switzerland)	1–2	(Germany) Karlsruher FC Phönix	Stadion Schützenmatte, Basel
	Goal	Summary	Goal

22 April 1923 End of season	Basel (Switzerland)	8–1	(Germany) Freiburger FC	Landhof, Basel
15:00	Goal	Summary	Goal	Referee: (Switzerland) Jacques Hirrle Basel

29 April 1923 End of season	Mulhouse XI (France)	1–1	(Switzerland) Basel	Mulhouse
	Goal	Summary	Goal

13 May 1923 End of season	Basel (Switzerland)	3–1	(Germany) 1. FC Pforzheim	Landhof, Basel
15:00	Wüthrich (1:0); Schneider (I) (2:0); Putzendopler (II) (3:1)	Summary	(2:1)	Attendance: 1,500; Referee: (Switzerland) Jacques Hirrle Basel

27 May 1923 End of season	Basel (Switzerland)	0–3	(Scotland) Rangers	Landhof, Basel
15:00		Summary	35' (0:1) Henderson (pen. 0:2) Cunningham (0:3) Archibald	Attendance: 6,000; Referee: (Switzerland) Felix Herren Basel

17 June 1923 End of season	Freiburger FC (Germany)	4–2	(Switzerland) Basel	Freiburg
	Stanzel (1:0); Stanzel (2:0) (o.g. 3:1) (4:1)	Summary	(2:1) (4:2)	Referee: (Switzerland) Jacques Hirrle Basel

=== Serie A ===
==== Central Group results ====
25 September 1922 Round 1	FC Bern	2–0	Basel	Kirchenfeld, Bern
	Wenger 10' (1:0); 89' (2:0)	Summary		Attendance: 2,500; Referee: (Switzerland) Edm. Dizerens Lausanne

1 October 1922 Round 2	Basel	1–1	Nordstern Basel	Landhof, Basel
15:00	Fahr (1:0)	Summary	(pen. 1:1) Flubacher	Attendance: 3,500; Referee: (Switzerland) Edm. Dizerens Lausanne

8 October 1922 Round 3	Luzern	0–3	Basel	Tribschen, Luzern
		Summary	(0:1) Fahr (0:2) Kaltenbach (0:3) Kuhn	Attendance: 1,500; Referee: (Switzerland) Ruegg Thalwil

15 October 1922 Round 4	Old Boys	1–1	Basel	Stadion Schützenmatte, Basel
15:00	Merkt (1:0)	Summary	(1:1) Wüthrich	Attendance: 3,500; Referee: (Switzerland) Guido Eichenberger Bern

22 October 1922 Round 5	Basel	1–3	Biel-Bienne	Landhof, Basel
15:00	Riesterer (1:3)	Summary	3' (0:1) Minder (0:2) Salvisberg (0:3) Blaser	Referee: (Switzerland) Epiney Genf

29 October 1922 Round 6	Aarau	0–2	Basel	Schachen, Aarau
		Summary	(o.g. 0:1) Pfister (0:2)	Referee: (Switzerland) John Forster La Chaux-de-Fonds

5 November 1922 Round 7	Nordstern Basel	0–0	Basel	Landhof, Basel
15:00		Summary		Referee: (Switzerland) Guido Eichenberger Bern

12 November 1922 Round 8	Basel	2–1	Young Boys	Landhof, Basel
14:45	Wüthrich (1:1); Schneider (I) (2:1)	Summary	(0:1) Von Arx (I)	Attendance: 3,000; Referee: (Switzerland) Wieland Zürich

26 November 1922 Round 9	Biel-Bienne	2–0	Basel	Gurzelen Stadion, Biel/Bienne
	Renser (1:0); Kramer (II) 80' (2:0)	Summary

3 December 1922 Round 10	Basel	P–P	Luzern	Landhof, Basel
		[ Summary]

21 January 1923 Round 11	Basel	0–5	Old Boys	Landhof, Basel
14:45		Summary	15' (0:1) Katz (0:2) Brack (0:3) Bohny (0:4) Wionsowsky (0:5) L'Eplattenier	Attendance: 3,000; Referee: (Switzerland) Guido Eichenberger Bern

4 February 1923 Round 12	Basel	3–0 FF	FC Bern	Landhof, Basel
15:00		Summary	Brandt (0:1); Afflerbach (0:2); Stämpfli (0:3); Afflerbach (0:4)	Attendance: 4,000; Referee: (Switzerland) John Forster La Chaux-de-Fonds
Note: Awarded forfait for Basel, the game had ended 0–4, but Bern used an unqualified player

18 February 1923 Round 10	Basel	2–0	Luzern	Landhof, Basel
15:00	Schlecht (1:0); Düblin (2:0)	Summary		Attendance: 1,500; Referee: (Switzerland) Ruegg Thalwil

4 March 1923 Round 13	Basel	4–3	Aarau	Landhof, Basel
15:00	Schneider (I) (1:1); Kuhn (2:1); Wüthrich (3:1); Fahr (4:3)	Summary	(0:1) Märki (II) (3:2) Märki (II) (3:3)	Attendance: 1,000; Referee: (Switzerland) Ruegg Thalwil

18 March 1923 Round 14	Young Boys	0–1	Basel	Spitalacker, Bern
		Summary	(0:1) Kuhn	Referee: (Switzerland) Ruegg Thalwil

==== Central Group table ====
Pos	Team	Pld	W	D	L	GF	GA	GD	Pts
1	Young Boys Bern	14	10	2	2	36	10	+26	22
2	FC Bern	14	11	0	3	35	13	+22	22
3	Old Boys	14	5	6	3	24	18	+6	16
4	Basel	14	6	3	5	17	22	−5	15
5	Nordstern Basel	14	5	4	5	18	18	0	14
6	Aarau	14	3	2	9	14	24	−10	8
7	Luzern	14	3	2	9	12	35	−23	8
8	Biel-Bienne	14	3	1	10	11	27	−16	7

Source: rsssf.com

== See also ==
- History of FC Basel
- List of FC Basel players
- List of FC Basel seasons

== Sources ==
- Rotblau: Jahrbuch Saison 2014/2015. Publisher: FC Basel Marketing AG. ISBN 978-3-7245-2027-6
- Die ersten 125 Jahre. Publisher: Josef Zindel im Friedrich Reinhardt Verlag, Basel. ISBN 978-3-7245-2305-5
- FCB team 1922–23 at fcb-archiv.ch
- Switzerland 1922-23 at RSSSF
