= Fritz Grüssi =

Swiss footballer

Personal information
- Full name: Fritz Grüssi
- Position: Defender

Senior career*
Years	Team	Apps	(Gls)
1919–1920	FC Basel	8	(0)
- * Club domestic league appearances and goals

Fritz Grüssi (date of birth unknown) was a footballer who played for FC Basel as a defender.

Grüssi joined FC Basel's first team for their 1919–20 season under coach and captain Otto Kuhn. Grüssi played his domestic league debut for the club in the home game in the Landhof on 9 November 1919, as Basel won 3–2 against Luzern.

In his one season with the club Grüssi played a total of 12 games for Basel without scoring a goal. Eight of these games were in the domestic league and four were friendly games.

== Sources ==
- Rotblau: Jahrbuch Saison 2017/2018. Publisher: FC Basel Marketing AG. ISBN 978-3-7245-2189-1
- Die ersten 125 Jahre. Publisher: Josef Zindel im Friedrich Reinhardt Verlag, Basel. ISBN 978-3-7245-2305-5
- Verein "Basler Fussballarchiv" Homepage
