= Walter Birbaum =

Swiss footballer

Personal information
- Full name: Walter Birbaum
- Place of birth: Switzerland
- Position: Goalkeeper

Senior career*
| Years | Team | Apps | (Gls) |
| until 1919 | Nordstern Basel | | |
| 1919–1920 | FC Basel | 3 | (0) |
| 1920– | Concordia Basel | | |
- * Club domestic league appearances and goals

Walter Birbaum was a Swiss footballer who played for Nordstern Basel, FC Basel and Concordia Basel. He played as goalkeeper.

In 1919 Birbaum moved from Nordstern Basel to FC Basel. His first game for his new club was on 21 December 1919 as Basel won 3–2 against Aarau. During the club's 1919–20 season Birbaum played just three Swiss Serie A games for Basel before he moved on again to Concordia Basel for the 1920–21 season.

== Sources ==
- Rotblau: Jahrbuch Saison 2017/2018. Publisher: FC Basel Marketing AG. ISBN 978-3-7245-2189-1
- Die ersten 125 Jahre. Publisher: Josef Zindel im Friedrich Reinhardt Verlag, Basel. ISBN 978-3-7245-2305-5
- Verein "Basler Fussballarchiv" Homepage
