= Albert Buser =

Swiss footballer

Personal information
- Full name: Albert Buser
- Place of birth: Switzerland
- Position: Striker

Senior career*
Years	Team	Apps	(Gls)
1918–1919	FC Basel	9	(1)
- * Club domestic league appearances and goals

Albert Buser (date of birth unknown) was a Swiss footballer who played in the 1910s as striker.

== Football career ==
Buser joined Basel's first team for their 1918–19 season. After playing in one test game, Buser played his domestic league debut for the club in the away game on 13 October 1918 as Basel played a 1–1 draw with FC Luzern.

Buser scored his first goal for his club in the away game on 24 October against local team Old Boys. It was Basel's first goal after they had already gone four goals down. With Buser's goal, Basel started a comeback and scored two more goals, but this was not enough because they lost 3–4 against their local rivals.

He stayed with the team only this one season and during this time Buser played a total of 13 games for Basel scoring a total of four goals. Nine of these games were in the Swiss Serie A and the other four were friendly games. He scored one goal in the domestic league and the others were scored during the test games.

== Sources ==
- Rotblau: Jahrbuch Saison 2017/2018. Publisher: FC Basel Marketing AG. ISBN 978-3-7245-2189-1
- Die ersten 125 Jahre. Publisher: Josef Zindel im Friedrich Reinhardt Verlag, Basel. ISBN 978-3-7245-2305-5
- Verein "Basler Fussballarchiv" Homepage

(NB: Despite all efforts, the editors of these books and the authors in "Basler Fussballarchiv" have failed to be able to identify all the players, their date and place of birth or date and place of death, who played in the games during the early years of FC Basel)
