= Charles Bouwmeester =

Swiss footballer

Personal information
- Full name: Charles Bouwmeester
- Position: Midfielder

Senior career*
Years	Team	Apps	(Gls)
1917–1918	FC Basel	4	(0)
- * Club domestic league appearances and goals

Charles Bouwmeester was a Swiss footballer who played for FC Basel. He played in the position as midfielder.

== Football career ==
Between 1917 and 1918, Bouwmeester played a total of six games for Basel, but he did not score a goal. Four of these matches were in the Swiss Serie A and the other two matches were friendly games.

== Sources ==
- Rotblau: Jahrbuch Saison 2017/2018. Publisher: FC Basel Marketing AG. ISBN 978-3-7245-2189-1
- Die ersten 125 Jahre. Publisher: Josef Zindel im Friedrich Reinhardt Verlag, Basel. ISBN 978-3-7245-2305-5
- Verein "Basler Fussballarchiv" Homepage
