= Karl Kroepfli =

Swiss footballer

Personal information
- Full name: Karl Kroepfli
- Date of death: unknown
- Position: Defender

Senior career*
Years	Team	Apps	(Gls)
1918–1921	FC Basel	11	(0)
- * Club domestic league appearances and goals

Karl Kroepfli was a footballer who played for FC Basel. He played as defender.

Kroepfli joined FC Basel's first team in 1918 and between the years 1918 and 1921 Kroepfli played a total of 13 games for Basel, scoring one goal. 11 of these games were in the Swiss Serie A and two were friendly games. He played his first league game for the club in the 1918–19 Serie A season on 13 October 1918 in the away game against Luzern. He scored only one goal for the club and this was on 29 May 1921. It was the last goal of the game against Karlsruher FV. This was a test game in the Landhof and Basel won by six goals to nil. It was also the last game that Kroepfli played for the club.

== Sources ==
- Rotblau: Jahrbuch Saison 2017/2018. Publisher: FC Basel Marketing AG. ISBN 978-3-7245-2189-1
- Die ersten 125 Jahre. Publisher: Josef Zindel im Friedrich Reinhardt Verlag, Basel. ISBN 978-3-7245-2305-5
- Verein "Basler Fussballarchiv" Homepage
