= Alfréd Schaffer =

Hungarian footballer and manager

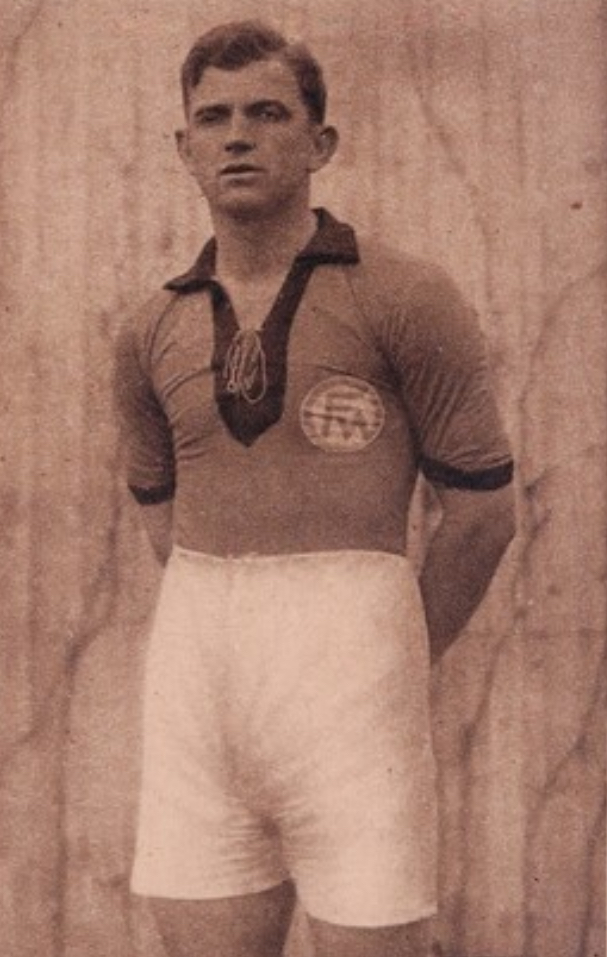

Personal information
- Date of birth: 13 February 1893
- Place of birth: Budapest, Austria-Hungary
- Date of death: 30 August 1945 (aged 52)
- Place of death: Prien am Chiemsee, Germany

Senior career*
Years	Team	Apps	(Gls)
- Tussen 1908
- Typographia SC
- Lipótváaros TC
- Ferencváros
- Budapesti TC
- KAOE
- Fővárosi TC
- FSK
- Terézvárosi TC
- Tatabanya SK
- Budapesti AK
1915–1919	MTK	89	(159)
1919–1920	1. FC Nürnberg	19	(33)
1920-1922	Wacker München	2	(1)
- Eintracht Frankfurt
- Hamburger SV
- Bayern Munich
1920	FC Basel	1	(0)
1923-1925	Amateur Vienna	38	(20)
1925-1926	Sparta Prague		
- New York Giants

International career
1915–1919	Hungary	15	(17)

Managerial career
- DSV München
- Wacker München
- Hertha BSC Berlin
- Wacker München
- 1932–1935: 1. FC Nürnberg
- 1935–1937: MTK Budapest FC
- 1938: Hungary
- 1940: Rapid Bucharest
- 1940–1942: AS Roma
- 1943–1944: Ferencváros
- * Club domestic league appearances and goals

Alfréd Schaffer (13 February 1893 – 30 August 1945) was a Hungarian international footballer. He is recorded as having played for a record number of clubs: 21 in a 15-year career which lasted from 1910 to 1925.

== Career ==
Born in Budapest, he joined MTK Budapest in 1915 and helped the club win three consecutive league titles, and in the latter two of those seasons (1917–18 and 1918–19) he was the top European league goalscorer with 42 and 41 goals respectively. Between April and September 1920 Schaffer played for FC Basel. He played one championship game and 19 test matches scoring a total of 27 goals.

After his playing days ended he became a football manager, and coached clubs such as 1. FC Nürnberg (for whom he also played), AS Roma and Ferencváros. In the beginning of 1940, Schaffer was coach at Rapid Bucharest, but left after only a few months to sign with AS Roma.

He coached Hungary at the 1938 FIFA World Cup.

He became manager of Roma in 1940, and led them to the 1941–42 Serie A title, before leaving the club in 1942.

He died in Prien am Chiemsee, Bavaria, on 30 August 1945.

== Honours ==
- Hungarian League Championship – 1917, 1918, 1919 (with MTK)
- German League Championship – 1921 (with 1. FC Nürnberg)
- Austrian League Championship – 1924 (with Amateur Vienna)
