= Ernst Zorzotti =

Swiss footballer

Personal information
- Full name: Ernst Zorzotti
- Place of birth: Switzerland
- Positions: Goalkeeper; striker

Senior career*
Years	Team	Apps	(Gls)
1918–1922	FC Basel	29	(2)
1922–1923	FC Bern		
1923–1931	FC Basel	84	(2)
- * Club domestic league appearances and goals

Ernst Zorzotti was a Swiss footballer who played 13 seasons for FC Basel and one season for FC Bern. He played mainly in the position of goalkeeper. He also played as a striker, but sometimes also as midfielder.

== Football career ==
Zorzotti joined FC Basel's first team in 1918. He played his domestic league debut as a goalkeeper on 24 April 1919 in the away fixture against Étoile-Sporting La Chaux-de-Fonds. Two weeks later on 4 May he played his first game to nil. This was the away game against Aarau which Basel won 3–0.

In the next season, he played his first eight domestic league games as goalkeeper. Then in the game on 29 February 1920 against Nordstern Basel Zorzotti played his first domestic league game as striker and teammate Arthur Fahr took over the position between the posts. In his very next game, away against Biel-Bienne on 7 March he scored his first goal for his team. Wilhelm Dietz scored the other two goals and Basel won the game 3–0.

Before the 1922–23 Swiss Serie A season, Zorzotti moved to FC Bern. He played just the one season there and returned to his original club before the next season began. By this time Theodor Schär had obtained the position as goalkeeper and Zorzotti played as striker. Schär left the club to join Servette after the 1924–25 season. Again, Zorzotti and Fahr shared the goalkeeper position.

A well-documented curiosity was that at the end of Basel's 1929–30 season, the team set off on a Scandinavian football tour, including a visit to Germany. Six games were played in Norway, but the first was played in Leipzig. The team travelled with 15 players, their trainer Kertész and two functionaries. The journey started with a train ride on 2 June 1930 at quarter past seven in the morning from Basel, and they arrived in Leipzig at half past eight that evening. The game against VfB Leipzig was played the next evening. The following one and a half days were spent travelling by train, train, ship, train and train again to Drammen in Norway. Only a few hours after their arrival, the team played a game against a joint team Mjøndalen IF / SBK Drafn. The next day was a train journey to Porsgrunn and two matches in 24 hours. Following that, they travelled per bus and then by ship in a 48-hour journey to Bergen for a match against SK Brann. Another ship voyage, this time to Stavanger, two games against Viking FK, then a ship voyage back to Bergen. Finally, the tour ended with three train journeys in three days, Bergen/Oslo/Berlin/Basel, arriving at home on 20 June. The result of this tour was seven games, four wins, one draw, two defeats and approximately 160 hours of travelling. Zorzotti was a participant in this tour, and he played in all seven games as goalkeeper.

Zorzotti ended his playing career after the 1930–31 season, in which he played solely as goalkeeper. His 191st and last game for Basel was on 28 June 1931, an away game against Blue Stars Zürich which Basel won 3–2. Between the years 1918 and 1931 Zorzotti played a total of 191 games for Basel, scoring a total of four goals. 113 of these games were in the Swiss Serie A, 11 in the Swiss Cup and 66 were friendly games. He scored all four of his goals in the domestic league.

== Sources ==
- Rotblau: Jahrbuch Saison 2017/2018. Publisher: FC Basel Marketing AG. ISBN 978-3-7245-2189-1
- Die ersten 125 Jahre. Publisher: Josef Zindel im Friedrich Reinhardt Verlag, Basel. ISBN 978-3-7245-2305-5
- Verein "Basler Fussballarchiv" Homepage
