= Wilhelm Dietz =

Swiss footballer

Personal information
- Full name: Wilhelm Dietz
- Place of birth: Switzerland
- Date of death: 3 April 1920
- Position: Striker

Senior career*
| Years | Team | Apps | (Gls) |
| 1917–1920 | FC Basel | 25 | (7) |
- * Club domestic league appearances and goals

Wilhelm Dietz (date of birth unknown; died 3 April 1920) was a Swiss footballer who played for FC Basel. He played mainly in the position as forward, but also as midfielder.

== Football career ==
Between the years 1917 and 1920 Dietz played a total of 31 games for Basel scoring a total of 13 goals. 25 of these games were in the Swiss Serie A and the other six were friendly games. He scored seven goals of his goals in the domestic league, the other six goals were scored during the test games. The Serie A away match played on 7 March 1920 against Biel-Bienne in Gurzelen Stadion was the last game that Wilhelm Dietz played as he died 4 weeks later aged just 19 years old.

== Sources ==
- Rotblau: Jahrbuch Saison 2017/2018. Publisher: FC Basel Marketing AG. ISBN 978-3-7245-2189-1
- Die ersten 125 Jahre. Publisher: Josef Zindel im Friedrich Reinhardt Verlag, Basel. ISBN 978-3-7245-2305-5
- Verein "Basler Fussballarchiv" Homepage
