= 1918–19 Swiss Serie A =

Swiss football season

Swiss Serie A
- Season: 1918–19

Statistics of Swiss Super League in the 1918–19 season.

== East ==
=== Table ===
Pos	Team	Pld	W	D	L	GF	GA	GD	Pts
1	FC Winterthur	14	12	1	1	57	22	+35	25
2	FC Zürich	14	9	1	4	38	23	+15	19
3	Grasshopper Club Zürich	14	9	1	4	49	32	+17	19
4	Brühl St. Gallen	14	7	2	5	40	31	+9	16
5	Neumünster Zürich	14	7	1	6	24	30	−6	15
6	Blue Stars Zürich	14	4	2	8	27	31	−4	10
7	FC St. Gallen	14	2	1	11	18	47	−29	5
8	Young Fellows Zürich	14	1	1	12	16	53	−37	3

Source: rsssf.com

== Central ==
=== Table ===
Pos	Team	Pld	W	D	L	GF	GA	GD	Pts
1	Etoile La Chaux-de-Fonds	14	11	2	1	42	9	+33	24
2	Old Boys Basel	14	8	3	3	31	18	+13	19
3	Nordstern Basel	14	8	3	3	23	15	+8	19
4	FC La Chaux-de-Fonds	14	8	3	3	32	23	+9	19
5	FC Basel	14	5	3	6	27	26	+1	13
6	FC Aarau	14	5	1	8	13	24	−11	11
7	FC Lucerne	14	2	3	9	18	27	−9	7
8	FC Biel	14	0	0	14	2	46	−44	0

Source: rsssf.com

== West ==
=== Table ===
Pos	Team	Pld	W	D	L	GF	GA	GD	Pts
1	Servette Genf	14	10	3	1	51	16	+35	23
2	Young Boys Bern	10	6	2	2	15	7	+8	14
3	FC Genf	12	5	1	6	28	35	−7	11
4	Lausanne Sports	12	4	3	5	19	16	+3	11
5	Cantonal Neuchatel	12	4	2	6	22	29	−7	10
6	FC Bern	10	3	3	4	13	18	−5	9
7	Stella Fribourg	8	2	0	6	17	25	−8	4
8	Montreux Sports	6	1	0	5	6	25	−19	2

Source: rsssf.com

== Final ==
=== Table ===
Pos	Team	Pld	W	D	L	GF	GA	GD	Pts
1	Etoile La Chaux-de-Fonds	2	2	0	0	5	3	+2	4
2	Servette Genf	2	0	1	1	2	3	−1	1
3	FC Winterthur	2	0	1	1	1	2	−1	1

Source: rsssf.com

=== Results ===
Team 1	Score	Team 2
1 June 1919
Servette	0–0	Winterthur
15 June 1919
Étoile-Sporting	3–2	Servette
22 June 1919
Étoile-Sporting	2–1	Winterthur

Etoile La Chaux-de-Fonds won the championship.

== Sources ==
- Switzerland 1918-19 at RSSSF
