= Karl Lott =

Swiss footballer (1901–1922)

Personal information
- Full name: Karl Lott
- Date of birth: 9 September 1901
- Place of birth: Switzerland
- Date of death: 26 August 1922 (aged 20)
- Position: Forward

Senior career*
Years	Team	Apps	(Gls)
1918 – 1921	FC Basel	13	(1)
- * Club domestic league appearances and goals

Karl Lott (9 September 1901 – 26 August 1922) was a Swiss footballer who played for FC Basel. He played mainly as a forward but also as a midfielder.

== Football career ==
Between the years 1918 and 1921 Lott played a total of 23 games for Basel scoring a total of two goals. 13 of these games were in the Swiss Serie A and 9 were friendly games. He scored one goal in the domestic league and one was scored during the test games.

== Sources ==
- Rotblau: Jahrbuch Saison 2017/2018. Publisher: FC Basel Marketing AG. ISBN 978-3-7245-2189-1
- Die ersten 125 Jahre. Publisher: Josef Zindel im Friedrich Reinhardt Verlag, Basel. ISBN 978-3-7245-2305-5
- Verein "Basler Fussballarchiv" Homepage
