= 1922–23 Swiss Serie A =

Swiss football season

Swiss Serie A
- Season: 1922–23

Statistics of Swiss Super League in the 1922–23 season.

== No championship title awarded ==
The team Young Boys sportingly ended the season as Central group winners. But before the start of the championship play-offs, the qualification match FC Biel-Bienne versus FC Bern (the game ended 3–1) from 25.02.1923 was awarded 0–3 due to ineligible players of FC Biel-Bienne. So both Young Boys Bern and FC Bern were level with 22 points and consequently a play-off was to be held for the regional championship. Young Boys withdrew from this match. Thus FC Bern continued to the finals, which they won. After the play-offs finals had been completed, the qualification match Basel versus FC Bern (the game ended 0–4) from 04.02.1923 was awarded 3–0 forfait because FC Bern had played an ineligible player. After this decision Young Boys were again winners of the regional group. The date of this decision was in September 1923 and there was not enough time left for a new Play-off Final before the next season started. Therefore, no Swiss championship title was awarded for 1922/23 season.

== East ==
=== Table ===
Pos	Team	Pld	W	D	L	GF	GA	GD	Pts
1	Young Fellows Zürich	14	10	3	1	40	12	+28	23
2	FC Zürich	14	8	2	4	27	24	+3	18
3	FC Winterthur	14	7	3	4	28	20	+8	17
4	Brühl St. Gallen	14	6	3	5	24	26	−2	15
5	Blue Stars Zürich	14	5	3	6	38	32	+6	13
6	Grasshopper Club Zürich	14	6	1	7	22	26	−4	13
7	FC St. Gallen	14	3	1	10	23	33	−10	7
8	FC Lugano	14	2	2	10	17	46	−29	6

Source: rsssf.com

=== Results ===
Home \ Away	BSZ	BRÜ	GCZ	LUG	STG	WIN	YFZ	ZÜR
Blue Stars Zürich		5–0	1–3	7–2	4–1	1–4	1–1	4–2
Brühl	3–3		1–0	4–1	3–1	1–1	1–0	1–2
Grasshopper	3–1	2–2		4–0	1–0	3–2	2–4	0–2
Lugano	2–4	3–1	1–0		1–5	2–7	0–0	1–3
St. Gallen	3–2	0–3	2–3	5–2		0–0	1–2	2–5
Winterthur	2–0	2–3	2–0	2–0	2–0		0–3	1–1
Young Fellows	3–3	4–1	5–0	2–0	3–2	6–1		3–0
Zürich	3–2	2–0	3–1	2–2	2–1	0–2	0–4	

Legend: Blue = home team win; Yellow = draw; Red = away team win.

== Central ==
=== Table ===
Pos	Team	Pld	W	D	L	GF	GA	GD	Pts
1	Young Boys Bern	14	10	2	2	36	10	+26	22
2	FC Bern	14	11	0	3	35	13	+22	22
3	Old Boys Basel	14	5	6	3	24	18	+6	16
4	FC Basel	14	6	3	5	17	22	−5	15
5	Nordstern Basel	14	5	4	5	18	18	0	14
6	FC Aarau	14	3	2	9	14	24	−10	8
7	FC Lucerne	14	3	2	9	12	35	−23	8
8	FC Biel	14	3	1	10	11	27	−16	7

Source: rsssf.com

=== Results ===
Home \ Away	AAR	BAS	BER	BIE	LUZ	NOR	OBB	YB
Aarau		0–2	0–3 (Note: Match awarded.)	2–0	0–2	0–1	1–2	0–3
Basel	4–3		3–0	1–3	2–0	1–1	1–1	2–1
Bern	2–0	2–0		3–0	0–2	2–1	2–0	1–6
Biel	0–3	2–0	0–3		0–3	0–2	1–1	1–2
Luzern	2–2	0–3	1–6	0–3		0–3	1–5	0–5
Nordstern	1–2	0–0	1–2	2–1	1–1		1–1	1–3
Old Boys	1–1	5–0	0–5	3–0	1–0	1–2		2–2
Young Boys	1–0	0–1	2–0	2–0	4–0	4–1	1–1	

Legend: Blue = home team win; Yellow = draw; Red = away team win.

== West ==
=== Table ===
Pos	Team	Pld	W	D	L	GF	GA	GD	Pts
1	Servette Genf	14	11	2	1	41	4	+37	24
2	Lausanne Sports	14	8	4	2	28	15	+13	20
3	Etoile La Chaux-de-Fonds	14	7	3	4	25	18	+7	17
4	FC La Chaux-de-Fonds	14	7	2	5	21	14	+7	16
5	Cantonal Neuchatel	14	5	1	8	11	35	−24	11
6	Urania Geneve Sports	14	3	4	7	15	20	−5	10
7	Montreux Sports	14	3	2	9	11	30	−19	8
8	FC Fribourg	14	2	2	10	14	30	−16	6

Source: rsssf.com

=== Results ===
Home \ Away	CAN	CDF	ÉTS	FRI	LS	MON	SER	UGS
Cantonal Neuchâtel		0–3	2–2	3–1	0–2	1–0	0–5	2–1
Chaux-de-Fonds	1–2		1–2	2–1	1–2	4–1	0–0	3–0
Étoile-Sporting	3–0	1–3		2–0	2–0	3–1	0–1	2–1
Fribourg	3–0	0–0	0–3		2–2	1–0	2–4	1–4
Lausanne-Sports	5–0	2–0	3–3	3–1		3–2	2–1	0–0
Montreux-Sports	1–0	0–2	2–1	2–0	1–1		0–2	1–1
Servette	8–0	3–0	3–0	2–0	1–0	8–0		0–0
Urania	0–1	0–1	1–1	3–2	1–3	3–0	0–3	

Legend: Blue = home team win; Yellow = draw; Red = away team win.

== Final ==
=== Table ===
Pos	Team	Pld	W	D	L	GF	GA	GD	Pts
1	FC Bern	2	1	1	0	2	1	+1	3
2	Young Fellows Zürich	2	1	0	1	2	2	0	2
3	Servette Genf	2	0	1	1	2	3	−1	1

Source: rsssf.com

=== Results ===
Team 1	Score	Team 2
6 May 1923
Bern	1–0	Young Fellows
13 May 1923
Young Fellows	2–1	Servette
27 May 1923
Bern	1–1	Servette

== Sources ==
- Switzerland 1922-23 at RSSSF
