= Fritz Raas =

Swiss football player (born 1895)

Fritz
Personal information
- Full name: Friedrich Raas
- Date of birth: 31 January 1895
- Place of birth: Switzerland
- Positions: Midfielder; forward

Senior career*
Years	Team	Apps	(Gls)
1915–1924	FC Basel	11	(0)
- * Club domestic league appearances and goals

Friedrich Raas (31 January 1895 – after 1923), commonly known as Fritz, was a Swiss footballer who played for FC Basel. He played mainly as a midfielder, but also as a forward.

== Football career ==
Between the years 1915 and 1921 Raas played 23 games for Basel without scoring; 11 games were in the Swiss Serie A and 12 were friendly games.

== Sources ==
- Rotblau: Jahrbuch Saison 2017/2018. Publisher: FC Basel Marketing AG. ISBN 978-3-7245-2189-1
- Die ersten 125 Jahre. Publisher: Josef Zindel im Friedrich Reinhardt Verlag, Basel. ISBN 978-3-7245-2305-5
- Verein "Basler Fussballarchiv" Homepage
