= Paul Dietz =

Swiss footballer

Personal information
- Full name: Paul Dietz
- Place of birth: Switzerland
- Position: Forward

Senior career*
Years	Team	Apps	(Gls)
1919–1924	FC Basel	28	(6)
- * Club domestic league appearances and goals

Paul Dietz was a Swiss footballer who played for FC Basel. He played mainly as a forward, but also as a midfielder.

== Football career ==
Between the years 1919 and 1924 Dietz played a total of 53 games for Basel scoring a total of 16 goals. 28 of these games were in the Swiss Serie A and 25 were friendly games. He scored six goal in the domestic league, the other 10 were scored during the test games.

== Sources ==
- Rotblau: Jahrbuch Saison 2017/2018. Publisher: FC Basel Marketing AG. ISBN 978-3-7245-2189-1
- Die ersten 125 Jahre. Publisher: Josef Zindel im Friedrich Reinhardt Verlag, Basel. ISBN 978-3-7245-2305-5
- Verein "Basler Fussballarchiv" Homepage
