= Gustav Buser =

Swiss association football player

Personal information
- Full name: Gustav Buser
- Position: Striker

Senior career*
Years	Team	Apps	(Gls)
1917–1920	FC Basel	12	(2)
- * Club domestic league appearances and goals

Gustav Buser was a footballer who played for FC Basel. He played in the position as forward.

== Football career ==
Between the years 1917 and 1920 Buser played a total of 18 games for Basel scoring a total of six goals. 12 of these games were in the Swiss Serie A and the other six were friendly games. He scored two goals in the domestic league, the other four were scored during the test games.

== Sources ==
- Rotblau: Jahrbuch Saison 2017/2018. Publisher: FC Basel Marketing AG. ISBN 978-3-7245-2189-1
- Die ersten 125 Jahre. Publisher: Josef Zindel im Friedrich Reinhardt Verlag, Basel. ISBN 978-3-7245-2305-5
- Verein "Basler Fussballarchiv" Homepage
