= 1919–20 Swiss Serie A =

Swiss football season

Swiss Serie A
- Season: 1919–20

Statistics of Swiss Super League in the 1919–20 season.

== East ==
=== Table ===
Pos	Team	Pld	W	D	L	GF	GA	GD	Pts
1	Grasshopper Club Zürich	14	10	2	2	33	13	+20	22
2	FC Zürich	14	9	4	1	37	13	+24	22
3	FC St. Gallen	14	7	2	5	28	21	+7	16
4	FC Winterthur	14	6	2	6	29	24	+5	14
5	Brühl St. Gallen	14	5	2	7	22	31	−9	12
6	Neumünster Zürich	14	5	2	7	22	34	−12	12
7	Young Fellows Zürich	14	2	4	8	19	40	−21	8
8	Blue Stars Zürich	14	0	6	8	22	36	−14	6

Source: rsssf.com

=== Results ===
Home \ Away	BSZ	BRÜ	GCZ	NEU	STG	WIN	YFZ	ZÜR
Blue Stars Zürich		4–5	1–1	1–1	2–3	2–2	3–3	2–2
Brühl	2–1		1–4	2–0	1–4	0–4	5–0	0–2
Grasshopper	3–0	1–1		4–0	1–0	2–0	3–2	0–2
Neumünster Zürich	5–4	3–2	2–5		2–1	1–3	2–2	0–2
St. Gallen	3–0	1–0	1–3	1–2		1–0	3–1	3–5
Winterthur	2–1	1–2	1–2	5–1	2–2		3–0	2–6
Young Fellows	1–1	5–0	0–3	0–3	1–4	3–2		1–1
Zürich	3–0	1–1	2–1	2–0	1–1	1–2	7–0	

Legend: Blue = home team win; Yellow = draw; Red = away team win.

== Central ==
=== Table ===
Pos	Team	Pld	W	D	L	GF	GA	GD	Pts
1	Young Boys Bern	14	12	2	0	41	13	+28	26
2	FC Basel	14	7	4	3	32	20	+12	18
3	FC Aarau	14	6	4	4	24	14	+10	16
4	Nordstern Basel	14	7	2	5	21	18	+3	16
5	Old Boys Basel	14	5	2	7	19	30	−11	12
6	FC Lucerne	14	4	3	7	18	28	−10	11
7	FC Bern	14	4	1	9	19	30	−11	9
8	FC Biel	14	1	2	11	15	36	−21	4

Source: rsssf.com

=== Results ===
Home \ Away	AAR	BAS	BER	BIE	LUZ	NOR	OBB	YB
Aarau		2–3	1–0	6–1	0–0	1–1	2–1	1–2
Basel	0–3		1–1	3–0	3–2	1–0	3–0	3–3
Bern	3–2	1–6		3–0	3–1	1–2	1–2	0–1
Biel	2–2	0–3	0–3		0–2	2–3	2–0	1–3
Luzern	0–2	2–2	1–3	2–0		3–1	3–3	0–1
Nordstern	0–0	2–1	5–2	2–1	2–0		0–2	0–1
Old Boys	0–2	2–1	3–1	2–2	1–0	1–2		2–10
Young Boys	1–0	2–2	3–0	3–2	8–1	2–2	1–0	

Legend: Blue = home team win; Yellow = draw; Red = away team win.

== West ==
=== Table ===
Pos	Team	Pld	W	D	L	GF	GA	GD	Pts
1	Servette Genf	14	11	0	3	42	24	+18	22
2	Etoile La Chaux-de-Fonds	14	8	4	2	51	22	+29	20
3	FC La Chaux-de-Fonds	14	5	3	6	31	29	+2	13
4	Cantonal Neuchatel	14	4	5	5	28	35	−7	13
5	FC Genf	14	3	6	5	20	31	−11	12
6	FC Fribourg	14	4	4	6	18	28	−10	12
7	Lausanne Sports	14	3	4	7	21	33	−12	10
8	Montreux Sports	14	2	6	6	15	24	−9	10

Source: rsssf.com

=== Results ===
Home \ Away	CAN	CDF	ÉTS	FRI	GEN	LS	MON	SER
Cantonal Neuchâtel		5–2	3–3	2–1	1–1	2–1	0–0	3–6
Chaux-de-Fonds	5–2		1–1	1–3	4–0	1–1	5–2	3–0
Étoile-Sporting	6–0	4–0		7–1	7–1	6–2	1–1	2–6
Fribourg	2–2	1–0	0–4		1–1	2–1	1–3	1–2
Genève	2–1	4–2	2–2	2–2		1–1	0–0	0–3
Lausanne-Sports	2–4	2–4	1–4	1–1	2–0		1–1	4–3
Montreux-Sports	1–1	2–2	0–3	0–1	2–4	0–1		1–3
Servette	3–2	2–1	4–1	2–1	3–2	4–1	1–2	

Legend: Blue = home team win; Yellow = draw; Red = away team win.

== Final ==
=== Table ===
Pos	Team	Pld	W	D	L	GF	GA	GD	Pts
1	Young Boys Bern	2	1	1	0	4	0	+4	3
2	Servette Genf	2	1	0	1	2	5	−3	2
3	Grasshopper Club Zürich	2	0	1	1	1	2	−1	1

Source: rsssf.com

=== Results ===
Team 1	Score	Team 2
9 May 1920
Young Boys	4–0	Servette
13 May 1920
Servette	2–1	Grasshopper
23 May 1920
Grasshopper	0–0	Young Boys

Young Boys Bern won the championship.

== Sources ==
- Switzerland 1919-20 at RSSSF
