= Christian Albicker =

Swiss footballer (1892-1934)

Personal information
- Full name: Christian Albicker (II)
- Date of birth: 5 January 1892
- Date of death: 22 September 1934 (aged 42)
- Positions: Midfielder; striker

Senior career*
Years	Team	Apps	(Gls)
1907 – 1920	FC Basel	70	(41)

International career
1913 – 1915	Switzerland	5	(1)
- * Club domestic league appearances and goals

Christian Albicker (5 January 1892 – 22 September 1934) was a Swiss footballer who played for FC Basel. He played mainly in the position as midfielder, but also as a striker.

Between the years 1907 and 1920, Albicker played a total of 126 games for Basel scoring a total of 58 goals.

Albicker played for the Swiss national football team on five occasions. His first game was on 9 March 1913 against France on 9 March 1913 in Geneva as Switzerland lost 1–4. In his fourth international game, also against France in Stade de Paris in Saint-Ouen, Seine-Saint-Denis, he scored the last minute equaliser in the 2–2 draw. His last international game was on 31 January 1915 in Turin in the 1–3 defeat against Italy.

== Sources and References ==
- Rotblau: Jahrbuch Saison 2017/2018. Publisher: FC Basel Marketing AG. ISBN 978-3-7245-2189-1
