= Jakob Känzig =

Swiss footballer (born 1893)

Personal information
- Full name: Jakob Känzig
- Date of birth: 7 May 1893
- Place of birth: Switzerland
- Positions: Midfielder; defender

Senior career*
Years	Team	Apps	(Gls)
1911–1922	FC Basel	48	(0)
- * Club domestic league appearances and goals

Jakob Känzig (born 7 May 1893; date of death unknown) was a Swiss footballer who played for FC Basel. He played mainly in the position as midfielder, but also as defender.

Between the years 1911 and 1922 Känzig played a total of 101 games for Basel, scoring one single goal. 48 of these games were in the Swiss Serie A and 53 were friendly games. He scored his only goal in the test game as Basel played away against SC Victoria Hamburg on 1 April 1922. The game ended in a 2–2 draw.

== Sources and References ==
- Rotblau: Jahrbuch Saison 2017/2018. Publisher: FC Basel Marketing AG. ISBN 978-3-7245-2189-1
- Die ersten 125 Jahre. Publisher: Josef Zindel im Friedrich Reinhardt Verlag, Basel. ISBN 978-3-7245-2305-5
- Verein "Basler Fussballarchiv" Homepage
