= Walter Rupprecht =

Swiss association football player

Personal information
- Full name: Walter Rupprecht
- Place of birth: Switzerland
- Date of death: 21 July 1954
- Place of death: Switzerland
- Position: Defender

Senior career*
Years	Team	Apps	(Gls)
1915–1924	FC Basel	5	(0)
- * Club domestic league appearances and goals

Walter Rupprecht (date of birth unknown; died 21 July 1954) was a Swiss footballer who played for FC Basel. He played in the position as defender.

Between the years 1915 and 1924 Rupprecht played a total of 17 games for Basel, scoring one goal. Five of these games were in the Swiss Serie A and twelve were friendly games. He only scored one goal and this was in the test game that Basel played in the Landhof on 14 October 1917. The game against Young Fellows Zürich ended with a 3–2 victory. Rupprecht scored Basel's third goal.

== Sources ==
- Rotblau: Jahrbuch Saison 2017/2018. Publisher: FC Basel Marketing AG. ISBN 978-3-7245-2189-1
- Die ersten 125 Jahre. Publisher: Josef Zindel im Friedrich Reinhardt Verlag, Basel. ISBN 978-3-7245-2305-5
- Verein "Basler Fussballarchiv" Homepage
