= Gurzelen Stadion =

Football stadium in Biel/Bienne, Switzerland

- Interactive map of Gurzelen Stadion
- Location: Biel/Bienne, Switzerland
- Coordinates: 47.145327°N 7.261039°E
- Capacity: 5,500
- Surface: Grass

Construction
- Opened: 1913

Tenant
- FC Biel-Bienne

Gurzelen Stadion was a multi-purpose stadium in Biel/Bienne, Switzerland. Inaugurated in 1913, it primarily served as the home ground of FC Biel-Bienne and was mainly used for football matches. The stadium had a seating capacity of approximately 5,500 spectators.

After FC Biel-Bienne relocated to the newly built Tissot Arena in 2015, Gurzelen Stadion was scheduled for demolition in mid-2016. However, the demolition was postponed, and in January 2017, the site was temporary repurposed for a cultural and community project called "Terrain Gurzelen". This project has since hosted a variety of public events and activities, promoting community engagement and temporary urban use.

As of 2025, the site remains active under the Terrain Gurzelen initiative, with ongoing programming including events such as Summerfest 2025 and other seasonal activities.

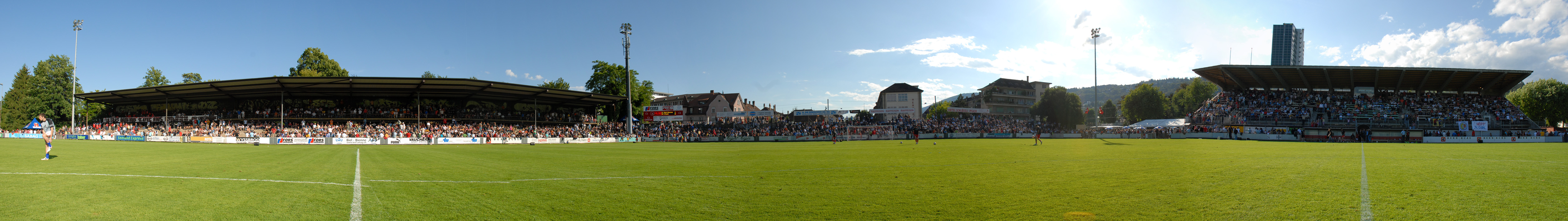
View of Gurzelen Stadion

== See also ==
- List of football stadiums in Switzerland
