= Karl Wüthrich =

Swiss association football player

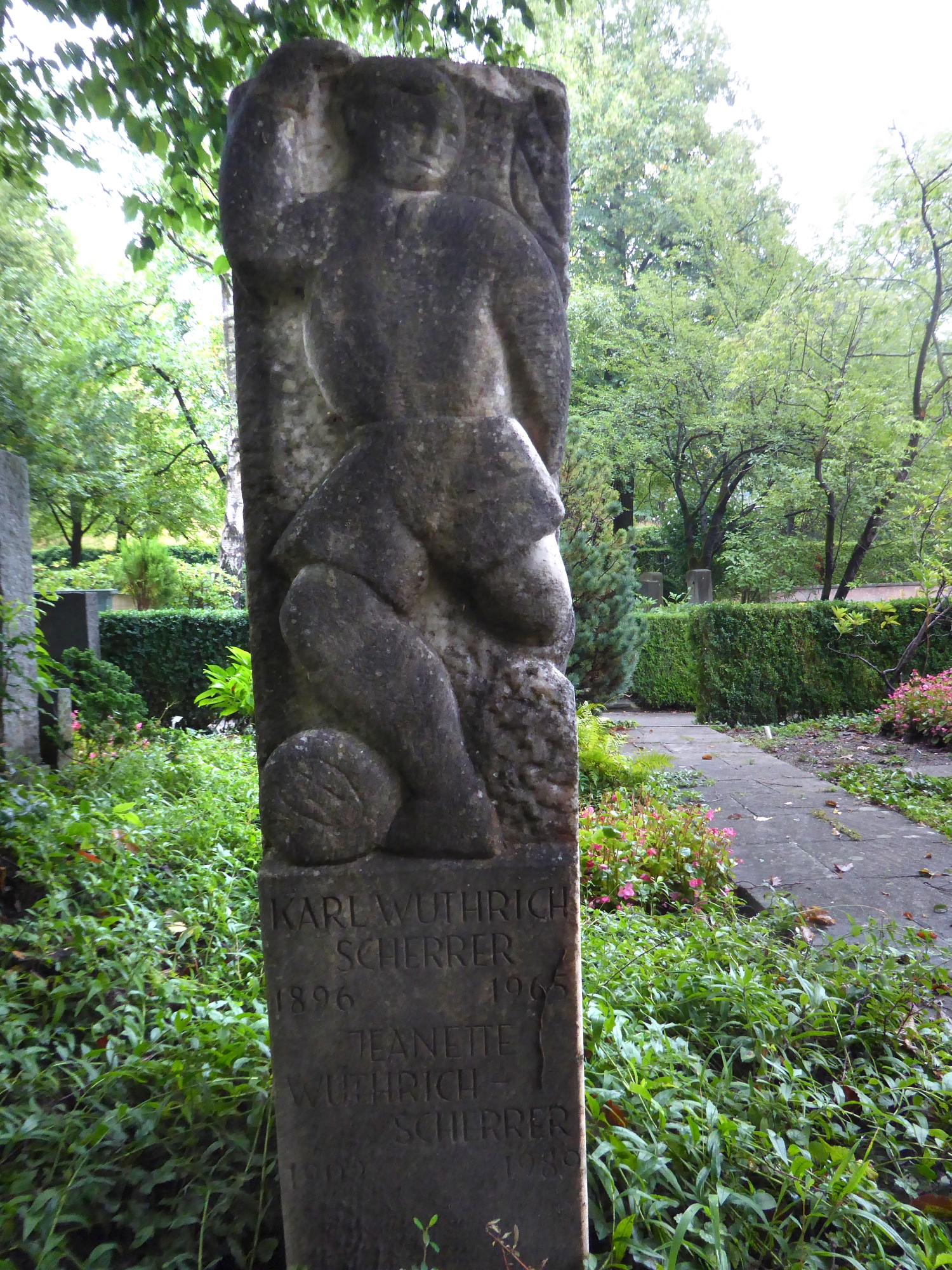
- His grave

Personal information
- Full name: Karl Wüthrich
- Place of birth: Switzerland
- Position: Striker

Senior career*
Years	Team	Apps	(Gls)
1915–1929	FC Basel	112	(50)
- * Club domestic league appearances and goals

Karl Wüthrich was a Swiss footballer who played for FC Basel. He played mainly in the position as forward.

Between the years 1915 and 1929 Wüthrich played a total of 202 games for Basel scoring a total of 112 goals. 112 of these games were in the Swiss Serie A and 90 were friendly games. He scored 50 goal in the domestic league, the other 62 were scored during the test games. He scored his first league goal in the Landhof on 10 October 1915 as Basel won 2–1 at home against Biel-Bienne. It was the winning goal.

== Sources ==
- Rotblau: Jahrbuch Saison 2017/2018. Publisher: FC Basel Marketing AG. ISBN 978-3-7245-2189-1
- Die ersten 125 Jahre. Publisher: Josef Zindel im Friedrich Reinhardt Verlag, Basel. ISBN 978-3-7245-2305-5
- Verein "Basler Fussballarchiv" Homepage
