= Otto Kuhn =

Swiss footballer (1896 to 1953)

Personal information
- Full name: Otto Kuhn
- Date of birth: 9 June 1896
- Place of birth: Basel
- Date of death: 29 June 1953 (aged 57)
- Positions: Goalkeeper; midfielder

Senior career*
Years	Team	Apps	(Gls)
1911–1924	FC Basel	107	(41)
- * Club domestic league appearances and goals

Otto Kuhn (* 9 June 1896 in Basel; † 29 June 1953) was a Swiss footballer who played for FC Basel. He played mainly in the position as goalkeeper, but he also played out in the field as midfielder. He later presided the club's board of directors.

Between the years 1911 und 1924 Kuhn played a total of 193 games for FC Basel scoring a total of 84 goals. Kuhn later became a member of the FC Basel board of directors. He was the club's chairman for two years from 1929 to 1931.

== Sources ==
- Rotblau: Jahrbuch Saison 2017/2018. Publisher: FC Basel Marketing AG. ISBN 978-3-7245-2189-1
