= 1915–16 FC Basel season =

FC Basel
1915–16 season
- Chairman: Philipp Leichner; Franz Rinderer
- First team coach: Ernst Kaltenbach (as team captain) until May 1916; Peter Riesterer (ad interim); 10 May to 30 June
- Ground: Landhof, Basel
- Serie A: Group Stage: 7th
- Top goalscorer: League: Emil Hasler (7) and Otto Kuhn (7); All: Otto Kuhn (13)
- Average home league attendance: n/a

The FC Basel 1915–16 season was their twenty-third season since the club's foundation on 15 November 1893. The club's chairman was Philipp Leichner at the beginning of the season and during the season Franz Rinderer took over as chairman. FC Basel played their home games in the Landhof in the district Wettstein in Kleinbasel. Retroactively, the most important event in this season is considered to be the founding of the clubs first youth department.

== Overview ==
It had been in planning for a few years and to the beginning of this season FCB founded their youth department and employed some part-time youth trainers. Right from the very first day there were over 50 youngsters who joined the teams. Amongst these youngsters, for example, was Walter Dietrich, who was 13 years old as he joined. Other youngsters were Karl Bielser, Max Galler, Theodor Schär and Ernst Zorzotti who were all to advance to become important first team players.

Because the holidays for the members of the Swiss Army are now becoming more frequent, a football championship as played in the pre-war years, could again be carried out as of the 1915–16 season. Team captain was Ernst Kaltenbach and as captain he led the trainings and was responsible for the line-ups. Basel played a total of 28 matches in this season. 14 of these matches were in the domestic league and 14 were friendly matches. Of these friendlies, six were won, three were drawn and five ended in a defeat. There were six one home fixtures played in the Landhof and eight away games. Four of these games were played in the Basel championship against the two other local teams Old Boys and Nordstern Basel. FC Basel won the Basel championship collecting three victories and a draw. In all of these friendly games Basel scored 31 goals and conceded 30.

The Swiss Serie A 1915–16 was divided into three regional groups, east, central and west. There were seven teams in the east group, eight in the central group and six in the west group. FC Baden could not participate because their field was used for agricultural purposes due to the war. Basel and the two other local teams, Old Boys and Nordstern Basel, were allocated to the Central group. Further teams playing in the central group were two from the capital, Young Boys and FC Bern, two from La Chaux-de-Fonds, FC La Chaux-de-Fonds, Étoile-Sporting FC La Chaux-de-Fonds and finally Biel-Bienne.

Basel didn't start well into the championship, winning only one of the first eight games. They ended the season in second-last position with nine points. In their 14 games Basel scored 30 goals and conceded 39. Local rivals Nordstern Basel were bottom of the league with just four points and these points were won in the derbys against Basel. Because during the war years there was no promotion or relegation, Nordstern did not have to play a play-out. The other local rivals Old Boys won the group and continued to the finals. Here they played against Cantonal Neuchatel and Winterthur. Cantonal eventually won the championship in the Finals.

== Players ==
Squad members

Note: Flags indicate national team as defined under FIFA eligibility rules; some limited exceptions apply. Players may hold more than one non-FIFA nationality.

No.	Pos.	Nation	Player
—	GK	SUI	Arthur Fahr
—	DF	SUI	Paul Bettex
—	DF	SUI	Hermann Moll
—	DF	SUI	Peter Riesterer
—	MF	SUI	Fritz Albicker (II)
—	MF	SUI	Ganter (I)
—	MF	SUI	Wilhelm Geisser
—	MF	SUI	Emil Hasler
—	MF	SUI	Ernst Kaltenbach
—	MF	SUI	Jakob Känzig
—	MF	SUI	Otto Kuhn
—	MF	SUI	Walter Rupprecht
—	FW	SUI	Fritz Aeppli
—	FW	SUI	Christian Albicker (I)

No.	Pos.	Nation	Player
—	FW		Rudolf Bredschneider
—	FW	SUI	Fritz Raas
—	FW	SUI	Louis Riesterer
—	FW	SUI	Karl Wunderle
—	FW	SUI	Karl Wüthrich
—		SUI	Ernst Bickel
—		SUI	Roger Breithaupt
—		SUI	Ernst Buss
—			Ernst Danzeisen (I)
—			Willy Danzeisen (II)
—			Philipp Leichner
—			Anton Rittel (I)
—			Ernst Rittel (II)
—			Weiss (III)

== Results ==
Legend

Win Draw Loss Postponed

=== Friendly matches ===
==== Pre-season ====
29 August 1915 Pre-season	Basel (Switzerland)	4–1	(Switzerland) St. Gallen	Landhof, Basel
15:00	Goal	Summary	Goal

26 September 1915 Pre-season	Basel (Switzerland)	1–4	(Switzerland) Servette	Landhof, Basel
15:40	Goal	Summary	Goal

==== Winter break ====
16 January 1916 Winter break	Winterthur (Switzerland)	2–2	(Switzerland) Basel	Schützenwiese, Winterthur
	(1:1) (2:1)	Summary	(0:1) (2:2)

23 January 1916 Winter break	Young Fellows Zürich (Switzerland)	8–1	(Switzerland) Basel	Zürich
	Rais (1:0); Weidmann (2:0); Meier (3:0); Leiber (4:0); Meier (5:0); Meier (6:0); Meier (7:0); Leiber (8:1)	Summary	(7:1)

13 February 1916 Winter break	Servette (Switzerland)	3–1	(Switzerland) Basel	Charmilles Stadium, Geneva
14:40	Raymond (IV) 2' (1:0); Ofterdinger (2:1); Raymond (IV) (3:1)	Summary	(1:1) Kuhn	Referee: (Switzerland) Heck, (Servette)

26 March 1916 Mid-season	Montriond Lausanne (Switzerland)	1–4	(Switzerland) Basel	Pontaise, Lausanne
15:00	Douglas (1:1)	Summary	(0:1) (1:2) (1:3) (1:4)

9 April 1916 Mid-season	Basel (Switzerland)	2–2	(Switzerland) Winterthur	Landhof, Basel
15:00	Wüthrich (1:0); Wüthrich (2:1)	Summary	(1:1) (2:2) Koblet	Referee: (Switzerland) Riesterer, (Basel)

24 April 1916 Mid-season	Zürich (Switzerland)	3–0	(Switzerland) Basel	Utogrund, Zürich
	Schuepp 15' (1:0); Oetiker (2:0) (o.g. 3:0)	Summary

30 April 1916 Mid-season	Basel (Switzerland)	0–2	(Switzerland) Montriond Lausanne	Landhof, Basel
		Summary	(0:1) Millenet (o.g. 0:2)	Referee: (Switzerland) Riesterer, (Basel)

14 May 1916 Basel championship	Basel (Switzerland)	5–1	(Switzerland) Nordstern Basel	Landhof, Basel
15:00	Moll (1:1); Kuhn (2:1); Kuhn (3:1); Ritte (4:1); Kuhn (5:1)	Summary	(pen. 0:1)	Attendance: 1,500; Referee: (Switzerland) E. Stutz Luzern

1 June 1916 Basel championship	Old Boys (Switzerland)	1–1	(Switzerland) Basel	Margarethenwiese Basel
15:00	Angoso (1:0)	Summary	(1:1) Ganter	Attendance: 1,600; Referee: (Switzerland) E. Stutz, (Luzern)

11 June 1916 End of season	Luzern (Switzerland)	1–6	(Switzerland) Basel	Tribschen, Luzern
15:00	1' (1:0)	Summary	(1:1) (1:2) (1:3) (1:4) (1:5) (1:6)	Referee: (Switzerland) E. Stutz, (Luzern)

2 July 1916 Basel championship	Basel (Switzerland)	2–1	(Switzerland) Old Boys	Landhof, Basel
15:00	Hasler (1:0); Kuhn 89' (2:1)	Summary	(pen. 1:1)	Attendance: 2,700; Referee: (Switzerland) Weber, (Zürich)

8 July 1916 Basel championship	Nordstern Basel (Switzerland)	0–2	(Switzerland) Basel	Staldenrain Riehen
15:00		Summary	11' (0:1) Kuhn (0:2)	Attendance: 1,500; Referee: (Switzerland) Zoller, (Basel)

=== Serie A ===
==== Central Group results ====
3 October 1915 Round 1	Étoile-Sporting	3–1	Basel	Stade du FC Etoile, La Chaux-de-Fonds
14:30	Wyss (I) 23' (1:0); Meier 25' (2:0); Hirschy 35' (3:0)	Summary	63' (3:1) Hasler	Referee: (Switzerland) Henninger, (CA Genève)

10 October 1915 Round 2	Basel	2–1	Biel-Bienne	Landhof, Basel
15:00	5' (o.g.); Wüthrich 78' (2:1)	Summary	(1:1)

17 October 1915 Round 3	FC Bern	3–1	Basel	Kirchenfeld, Bern
14:30	(1:1); Brand (2:1) (3:1)	Summary	15' (0:1)	Attendance: 1,000; Referee: (Switzerland) Henninger, (CA Genève)

31 October 1915 Round 4	Nordstern Basel	4–2	Basel	Staldenrain, Riehen
15:00	Bollinger 1' (pen. 1:0); Gaus (2:2); Bollinger (pen. 3:2); Bollinger 84' (4:2)	Summary	(1:1) Hasler; 31' (1:2) Hasler	Referee: (Switzerland) Weber

7 November 1915 Round 5	Young Boys	3–3	Basel	Spitalacker, Bern
15:00	Funk (I) (pen. 1:1); Funk (I) (2:3); Mangold (3:3)	Summary	(0:1) Hasler (1:2) (1:3)	Attendance: 1,500; Referee: (Sweden) Heck

21 November 1915 Round 6	Basel	1–2	La Chaux-de-Fonds	Landhof, Basel
15:00	Hasler (1:0)	Summary	(1:1) Perrenoud (II); 75' (1:2) Reutter	Referee: (Switzerland) Willy Beuttner, (FC Zürich)

28 November 1915 Round 7	Basel	1–6	Old Boys	Landhof, Basel
	Hasler (1:0); Hasler (penalty missed)	Summary	(pen. 1:1) Kalt (o.g. 1:2) Wüthrich (1:3) (1:4) (1:5) (1:6)	Attendance: 1,000; Referee: (Switzerland) Keller

5 December 1915 Round 8	Biel-Bienne	6–2	Basel	Gurzelen Stadion, Biel/Bienne
15:00	Marbot 1' (1:0); Gnägi (2:0); Keller (3:0); Keller (4:1); Siegrist (5:1); Keller (6:2)	Summary	(1:3) Hasler (5:2) Albicker (I)	Referee: (Switzerland) Beuttner

30 January 1916 Round 9	Basel	P–P	Young Boys	Landhof, Basel
15:00		Summary		Referee: (Switzerland) Weber

22 February 1916 Round 10	Basel	5–3	Étoile-Sporting	Landhof, Basel
15:00	Kuhn (1:0); Kuhn (2:1); Kuhn (3:1); Kuhn (4:1); Buss (5:1)	Summary	(1:1) (5:2) (5:3)	Referee: (Switzerland) Graffenried

5 March 1916 Round 11	Basel	1–2	FC Bern	Landhof, Basel
15:00	(1:1)	Summary	(0:1) Weiss (1:2) Weiss

12 March 1916 Round 12	Old Boys	3–2	Basel	Margarethenwiese, Basel
15:00	Katz 24' (pen. 1:0); Ferralli 40' (2:1); Wionsowsky 60' (3:1)	Summary	25' (1:1) Wunderle; 87' (3:2) Albicker (I)	Attendance: 2,000; Referee: (Switzerland) Reich

2 April 1916 Round 13	Basel	0–1	Nordstern Basel	Landhof, Basel
15:00		Summary	87' (0:1) Bollinger	Referee: (Switzerland) Schaller, (Basel)

7 May 1916 Round 14	La Chaux-de-Fonds	0–5	Basel	Parc des Sports, La Chaux-de-Fonds
14:45		Summary	9' (0:1) Kuhn (0:2) Kuhn (0:3) Kuhn (0:4) (0:5) Albicker (I)	Attendance: 1,500; Referee: (Switzerland) Jacques

21 May 1916 Round 9	Basel	4–2	Young Boys	Landhof, Basel
15:00	Moll (pen. 1:1); Wunderle (2:2); Kaltenbach (3:2); Wüthrich (4:2)	Summary	(0:1) Funk (II) (1:2) Funk (II)	Referee: (Switzerland) Weber

==== Central Group league table ====
Pos	Team	Pld	W	D	L	GF	GA	GD	Pts	Qualification
1	Old Boys	14	9	3	2	47	31	+16	21	Advance to finals
2	FC Bern	14	9	2	3	41	23	+18	20	
3	Étoile-Sporting	14	7	2	5	46	27	+19	16	
4	Young Boys	14	6	3	5	33	26	+7	15	
5	Biel-Bienne	14	6	2	6	29	26	+3	14	
6	La Chaux-de-Fonds	14	6	1	7	23	32	−9	13	
7	Basel	14	4	1	9	30	39	−9	9	
8	Nordstern Basel	14	2	0	12	16	61	−45	4	

Source: rsssf.com

== See also ==
- History of FC Basel
- List of FC Basel players
- List of FC Basel seasons

== Sources ==
- Rotblau: Jahrbuch Saison 2014/2015. Publisher: FC Basel Marketing AG. ISBN 978-3-7245-2027-6
- Die ersten 125 Jahre. Publisher: Josef Zindel im Friedrich Reinhardt Verlag, Basel. ISBN 978-3-7245-2305-5
- FCB team 1915–16 at fcb-archiv.ch
- Switzerland 1915-16 at RSSSF
