= 1914–15 FC Basel season =

FC Basel
1914–15 season
- Chairman: Ernst-Alfred Thalmann
- First team coach: Christian Albicker (as team captain)
- Ground: Landhof, Basel
- Serie A: Group Stage: Third
- Top goalscorer: Emil Hasler (7)
- Average home league attendance: n/a

The FC Basel 1914–15 season was their twenty-second season since the club's foundation on 15 November 1893. The club's chairman was Ernst-Alfred Thalmann, it was his twelfth presidential term all together. FC Basel played their home games in the Landhof in the district Basel-Wettstein in Kleinbasel, Basel.

== Overview ==
The professional trainer, Englishman Percy Humphreys, was due to continue his job this season, but due to the outbreak of the first World War he had to return home.

The war also caused further impingements to the football season. There were no pre-season matches and championship start was delayed. In their 1914–15 season, Basel played 11 matches. 6 of these were in the domestic league and 5 were friendly matches. Of these friendlies, 3 were won and 2 ended in a defeat. There was one home fixture played in the Landhof and four away games. In these friendly games, Basel scored 12 and conceded 12 goals.

Also due to the war, the Swiss Serie A 1914–15 was played as an interim Championship, there was no relegation and promotion between Serie A and Serie B. The Serie A was divided into four regional groups, an east, a west and two central groups. Basel were allocated to the central group A together with their local rivals Old Boys, Nordstern Basel and the reigning champions Aarau. Basel started into the championship with an away defeat against Aarau. Then they won both home games against the other two local teams. After the new year and the away draw against Nordstern, Basel lost the home game against Aarau and the away game against Old Boys, to finish in third position in the league table. In their six games, Basel scored 15 goals and conceded 14. Aarau continued to the semifinal, but there they were defeated by Brühl St. Gallen. Brühl also won the final 3–0 against Servette to become the new Swiss champions.

== Players ==
Squad members

Note: Flags indicate national team as defined under FIFA eligibility rules; some limited exceptions apply. Players may hold more than one non-FIFA nationality.

No.	Pos.	Nation	Player
—	GK	SUI	Arthur Fahr
—	DF	SUI	Paul Bettex
—	DF	SUI	Hermann Moll
—	DF	SUI	Peter Riesterer
—	MF	SUI	Fritz Albicker (II)
—	MF	SUI	Wilhelm 'Willy' Geisser
—	MF	SUI	Emil Hasler
—	MF	SUI	Ernst Kaltenbach
—	MF	SUI	Jakob Känzig
—	MF	SUI	Emil Schreyer
—	FW	SUI	Fritz Aeppli

No.	Pos.	Nation	Player
—	FW	SUI	Christian Albicker (I)
—	FW		Rudolf Bredschneider
—	FW	SUI	Karl Wunderle
—			Roger Breithaupt
—			Walter Flück
—			? Gossweiler
—			? Rittel
—			Ernst Bickel
—			? Borer
—			Philipp Leichner
—			Rud. Steffen

== Results ==
Legend

Win Draw Loss

=== Friendly matches ===
Old Boys	1–6	Basel
Goal	Summary	Goal

17 January 1915	Old Boys	0–1	Basel	Margarethenwiese, Basel
		Summary	Albicker (I)	Referee: (Switzerland) Schmidlin, (Nordstern Basel)

28 February 1915	Basel	5–3	Young Boys	Landhof, Basel
15:00	Emil Hasler (1:0); Albicker (II) (2:0); Schreyer (3:2); Bredschneider (4:2); Albicker (II) (5:3)	Summary	(2:1) Bertschi; 32' (2:2) Mangold; (penalty missed) Mangold; 67' (4:3) Funk II; (penalty missed) Funk II	Attendance: 600; Referee: (Switzerland) Louis Riesterer, (Basel)

7 March 1915	Young Boys	6–0	Basel	Spitalacker, (Bern)
	Mangold (1:0); Bommer (2:0); Adamina (3:0); Funk (II) (4:0); Klopfenstein (5:0); Mangold (6:0)	Summary		Referee: (Switzerland) J. Blum, (Young Boys)

25 April 1915	Grasshopper Club	2–0	Basel	Zürich
	(1:0) (2:0)	Summary

=== Serie A ===
==== Central Group A results ====
6 December 1914 Round 1	Aarau	5–1	Basel	Stadion Brügglifeld, Aarau
	Osterwlder; Brändli; Gysi 65' (3:1); Gysi (4:1); Märk (5:1)	Summary	Emil Hasler	Referee: (Switzerland)

20 December 1914 Round 2	Basel	6–0	Old Boys	Landhof, Basel
14:30	Albicker (I) 33' (1:0); Albicker (I) 35' (2:0); Gossweiler (3:0); Albicker (I) (4:0); Schreyer (5:0); Hasler (6:0)	Summary		Attendance: 1,500; Referee: (Switzerland) Schmid, (Nordstern Basel)

27 December 1914 Round 3	Basel	4–2	Nordstern Basel	Landhof, Basel
14:30	Hasler 19' (1:0); Albicker (I) 30' (2:0); Hasler (3:2); Hasler 75' (4:2)	Summary	65' (2:1) Schneider (2:2) Franzon	Attendance: 1,000; Referee: (Switzerland) Nater

10 January 1915 Round 4	Nordstern Basel	3–3	Basel	Staldenrain, Riehen
15:00	Bollinger 42' (1:1); Ganter (2:2); Ganter (3:2)	Summary	34' (0:1) Hasler; 48' (1:2) Hasler (3:3) Wunderle	Attendance: 500; Referee: (Switzerland) Stutz, (Old Boys)

21 February 1915 Round 5	Basel	0–2	Aarau	Landhof, Basel
15:00		Summary	41' (0:1) Rubli II; 55' (0:2) Bessmer I	Attendance: 2,500; Referee: (Switzerland) Schmid, (Nordstern Basel)

16 May 1915 Round 6	Old Boys	2–1	Basel	Margarethenwiese, Basel
15:00	Grunauer (1:0); Grunauer (2:0)	Summary	(1:1)	Attendance: 800; Referee: (Switzerland) Thurnheer, (Biel-Bienne)

==== Central Group A league table ====
Pos	Team	Pld	W	D	L	GF	GA	GD	Pts	Qualification
1	Aarau	6	5	0	1	18	7	+11	10	Advance to finals
2	Old Boys	6	4	0	2	15	16	−1	8	
3	Basel	6	2	1	3	15	14	+1	5	
4	Nordstern Basel	6	0	1	5	8	19	−11	1	

Source: rsssf.com

== See also ==
- History of FC Basel
- List of FC Basel players
- List of FC Basel seasons

== Sources ==
- Rotblau: Jahrbuch Saison 2014/2015. Publisher: FC Basel Marketing AG. ISBN 978-3-7245-2027-6
- Die ersten 125 Jahre. Publisher: Josef Zindel im Friedrich Reinhardt Verlag, Basel. ISBN 978-3-7245-2305-5
- FCB team 1914–15 at fcb-archiv.ch
