= 1916–17 FC Basel season =

FC Basel
1916–17 season
- Chairman: Franz Rinderer
- First team coach: Peter Riesterer (as team captain)
- Ground: Landhof, Basel
- Serie A: Group Stage: Second
- Top goalscorer: League: Karl Wüthrich (6); All: Karl Wüthrich (12)
- Average home league attendance: n/a

The FC Basel 1916–17 season was their twenty-fourth season since the club's foundation on 15 November 1893. The club's chairman was Franz Rinderer. FC Basel played their home games in the Landhof in the district Wettstein in Kleinbasel.

== Overview ==
Peter Riesterer was team captain and as captain he led the trainings and was responsible for the line-ups. Basel played a total of 28 matches in the 1916–17 season. 12 of these were in the domestic league and 16 were friendly matches. Of these friendlies eight were won, three were drawn and five ended in a defeat. There were three home fixtures played in the Landhof and 13 away games. Over the Christmas, New Year period the team were taken to a training camp in Barcelona. On Christmas Eve and on boxing day they played to friendlies against Barcelona. The first game ended in a defeat and the second was one. Two days later Basel played a friendly in same stadium, Camp de la Indústria, against La Chaux-de-Fonds and they were able to win this game too. On New Year's Eve and on New Year's Day Basel played two friendlies against local club Terrassa. Tarrassa were Serie B champions and played with five loaned first-class players. The first game was drawn and Basel won the second. Four of these friendly matches were played in the so-called Basel championship against the two other local teams Old Boys and Nordstern Basel. Due to the early date of the new season, the three teams decided to play the return matches of the Championship all on one day as a tournament and played shortened games, two halves each with just 30 minutes. FC Basel won the Championship.

The domestic league, Swiss Serie A 1916–17, was divided into three regional groups, an east, a central and a west group. There were eight teams in the east and the west group, but only seven in the central group. Basel and the two other local teams were allocated to the Central group. The other teams playing in the Central group were FC Bern, Young Boys Bern, Biel-Bienne and Aarau. Basel played a good season, suffering only two defeats. Looking at things from the local point of view, Basel took three point from the two games against Old Boys and won both of their games against Nordstern Basel. Nordstern were in last position in the league table, but during the period of World War I there was not relegation/promotion between the Serie A and Serie B. Basel ended the season in second position with 15 points. In their 12 games Basel scored 31 goals and conceded 20. Karl Wüthrich was the team's best goal scorer, netting six times in 11 games.

The Young Boys won the central group and continued to the finals. Here they played against La Chaux-de-Fonds and VFC Winterthur-Veltheim. Winterthur won both games in the finals and won the championship title.

== Players ==
Squad members

Note: Flags indicate national team as defined under FIFA eligibility rules; some limited exceptions apply. Players may hold more than one non-FIFA nationality.

No.	Pos.	Nation	Player
—	GK	SUI	Arthur Fahr
—	DF	SUI	Emil Ganter
—	DF	SUI	Hermann Moll
—	DF	SUI	Peter Riesterer
—	DF	SUI	Anton Rittel (I)
—	MF	SUI	Fritz Albicker (II)
—	MF	SUI	Wilhelm Geisser
—	MF	SUI	Emil Hasler
—	MF	SUI	Ernst Kaltenbach
—	MF	SUI	Jakob Känzig
—	MF	SUI	Otto Kuhn
—	MF	SUI	Fritz Raas
—	FW	SUI	Christian Albicker (I)
—	FW	SUI	Karl Bielser

No.	Pos.	Nation	Player
—	FW	SUI	Rudolf Bredschneider
—	FW	SUI	Ernst Rittel (II)
—	FW	SUI	Carl Schloz
—	FW	SUI	Karl Wüthrich
—	FW		Valentin von der Mühll
—			Borer
—			Fritz Eggenschwyler
—			Forster
—		SUI	Walter Grunauer
—			Haas
—			Kientsch
—			Oscar Kohler
—		SUI	Jules Lotter
—			Perroud

== Results ==
Legend

Win Draw Loss Postponed

=== Friendly matches ===
==== Pre- and mid-season ====
10 September 1916 Pre-season	Basel (Switzerland)	2–2	(Switzerland) Regiment 22	Landhof, Basel
15:00	Wüthrich 20' (1:0); Kuhn (2:0)	Summary	Goal	Referee: (Switzerland) Riesterer FC Basel

1 October 1916 Pre-season	Montriond Lausanne (Switzerland)	2–0	(Switzerland) Basel	Olympique de la Pontaise, Lausanne
15:00	Inäbnit 35' (1:0); Gottofrey (2:0)	Summary		Attendance: 800; Referee: (Switzerland) Jacques (Montriond-Sports)

26 November 1916 Mid-season	Old Boys (Switzerland)	5–2	(Switzerland) Basel	Margarethenwiese, Basel
15:00	Goal	Summary	Goal	Referee: (Switzerland)

==== Winter break to end of season ====
24 December 1916 Winter break	Barcelona (Spain)	3–1	(Switzerland) Basel	Camp de la Indústria, Barcelona
15:00	Garchitorena (1:0); Garchitorena (2:0); Hormeu (3:1)	Summary	Haas	Attendance: 4,000; Referee: (Spain) Francisco Brú

26 December 1916 Winter break	Barcelona (Spain)	1–3	(Switzerland) Basel	Camp de la Indústria, Barcelona
15:00	Garchitorena (1:0)	Summary	(1:1) Wüthrich (1:2) Albicker (I) (1:3) Wüthrich	Referee: (Spain) Hamilton

28 December 1916 Winter break	La Chaux-de-Fonds (Switzerland)	1–2	(Switzerland) Basel	Camp de la Indústria, Barcelona
14:45	Goal	Summary	Goal	Attendance: 2,000; Referee: (Spain) Francisco Brú

31 December 1916 Winter break	Terrassa (Spain)	1–1	(Switzerland) Basel	Terrassa
	Torrella (1:0)	Summary	89' (1:1) Kaltenbach

1 January 1917 Winter break	Terrassa (Spain)	3–4	(Switzerland) Basel	Terrassa
	(1:0) (2:4) (3:4)	Summary	(1:1) (1:2) (1:3) (1:4)

8 April 1917 Mid-season	Zürich (Switzerland)	3–4	(Switzerland) Basel	Utogrund, Zürich
	Goal	Summary	Goal	Referee: (Switzerland) Peterhans

20 May 1917 End-of-season	Basel (Switzerland)	0–1	(Switzerland) Winterthur	Landhof, Basel
15:00		Summary	Goal	Referee: (Switzerland) Ollmann (Concordia Basel)

2 June 1917 Basel championship	Nordstern Basel (Switzerland)	3–3	(Switzerland) Basel	Margarethenwiese, Basel
18:00	Chollet (pen. 1:1); Gaus (2:1); Bollinger (3:3)	Summary	6' (0:1) Albicker (I); 45' (2:2) Kuhn; 50' (2:3)	Referee: (Switzerland) Wenger, (Old Boys)

11 June 1917 Semi-Final; Ostschweizerisches Turnier	Young Fellows Zürich (Switzerland)	1–5	(Switzerland) Basel	Zürich
	(1:4)	Summary	(0:1) (0:2) (0:3) (0:4) (1:5) Kaltenbach

11 June 1917 Final; Ostschweizerisches Turnier	Blue Stars Zürich (Switzerland)	1–0	(Switzerland) Basel	Zürich
	(1:0)	Summary	(penalty missed) Kaltenbach

17 June 1917 Basel championship	Basel (Switzerland)	4–2	(Switzerland) Old Boys	Landhof, Basel
17:00	Kaltenbach (1:0); Wüthrich (2:0); Albicker (I) (3:0); Moll (pen. 4:1)	Summary	(3:1) Danzeisen (I) (4:2) Danzeisen (I)

1 July 1917 Basel championship	Basel (Switzerland)	2–0	(Switzerland) Nordstern Basel	Margarethenwiese, Basel
16:15	Schloz 10' (1:0); Kaltenbach 20' (2:0)	Summary		Attendance: 1,000
Note: Due to the advanced season, the 3 participating clubs decided to hold this tournament in one day, the games lasted 2 x 30 minutes.

1 July 1917 Basel championship	Old Boys (Switzerland)	1–4	(Switzerland) Basel	Margarethenwiese, Basel
17:00	Dürr 27' (pen. 1:2)	Summary	9' (o.g. 0:1) Monta (0:2) Wüthrich; 46' (1:3) Schloz; 53' (pen. 1:4) Wüthrich	Attendance: 1,000
Note: Due to the advanced season, the 3 participating clubs decided to hold this tournament in one day, the games lasted 2 x 30 minutes.

=== Serie A ===
==== Central group results ====
8 October 1916 Round 1	Biel-Bienne	4–3	Basel	Bern
	Hugi 53' (1:1); Hugi (2:1) (3:2); Grupp 83' (4:3)	Summary	44' (0:1) Lotter (pen. 2:2) (3:3) Bredschneider	Referee: (Switzerland) A. Sandoz Lausanne

15 October 1916 Round 2	Basel	3–3	FC Bern	Landhof, Basel
15:00	Kuhn 12' (1:0); Wüthrich 35' (2:0); Moll (pen. 3:3)	Summary	38' (o.g. 2:1) Moll (2:2) (2:3) Schmiedlin	Referee: (Switzerland) John Forster La Chaux-de-Fonds

29 October 1916 Round 3	Basel	6–2	Nordstern Basel	Landhof, Basel
15:00	Moll 1' (pen. 1:0); Wüthrich 10' (2:0); Ganter 23' (3:2); Albicker (I) (4:2); Albicker (I) (5:2); Ganter 89' (6:2)	Summary	17' (2:1) Bollinger; 22' (2:0) Bollinger	Referee: (Switzerland) Weber

5 November 1916 Round 4	Aarau	0–4	Basel	Aarau
		Summary	49' (0:1) Albicker (I); 52' (0:2)	Referee: (Switzerland) Jacques Reich VFC Winterthur-Veltheim

12 November 1916 Round 5	Basel	0–0	Young Boys	Landhof, Basel
15:00		Summary		Attendance: 3,000; Referee: (Switzerland) Stutz

17 December 1916 Round 6	Old Boys	0–4	Basel	Margarethenwiese, Basel
15:00	Penalty missed	Summary	Wüthrich 35' (0:1); Wüthrich 40' (0:2); Riesterer (pen. 0:3); Wüthrich 75' (0:4)	Referee: (Switzerland) Weber

25 February 1917 Round 7	Nordstern Basel	1–2	Basel	Staldenrain, Riehen
15:00	Afflerbach 12' (1:0)	Summary	(o.g. 1:1) Solberger; 29' (1:2) Wüthrich	Attendance: 1,200; Referee: (Switzerland) John Forster La Chaux-de-Fonds

25 March 1917 Round 8	Young Boys	6–1	Basel	Spitalacker, Bern
15:00	Hubbard (1:0); Funk (II) (2:0); Klopfenstein 7' (3:0); Funk (I) 35' (4:0); Hubbard (5:0); Klopfenstein (6:1)	Summary	(5:1)	Referee: (Switzerland) Reich Winterthur

1 April 1917 Round 9	Basel	0–0	Aarau	Landhof, Basel
15:00		Summary		Referee: (Switzerland) Willy Beuttner FC Zürich

15 April 1917 Round 10	Basel	7–3	Biel-Bienne	Landhof, Basel
15:00	(1:2) (2:2) (3:2) (4:2) (5:3) (6:3) (7:3)	Summary	(0:1) Grupp (0:2) (4:3)	Referee: (Switzerland) Reich Winterthur

22 April 1917 Round 11	FC Bern	1–1	Basel	Kirchenfeld, Bern
15:00	Orth (1:0)	Summary	(1:1) Albicker (I)	Referee: (Switzerland) Ch. Kult-Reynaud Genève

6 May 1917 Round 12	Basel	0–0	Old Boys	Landhof, Basel
15:00	Riesterer (penalty missed)	Summary		Attendance: 1,000; Referee: (Switzerland) Ammann Cantonal Neuchatel

==== Central group league table ====
Pos	Team	Pld	W	D	L	GF	GA	GD	Pts	Qualification
1	Young Boys	12	8	2	2	31	15	+16	18	Advance to finals
2	Basel	12	5	5	2	31	20	+11	15	
3	Aarau	12	5	3	4	23	21	+2	13	
4	Biel-Bienne	12	6	0	6	37	45	−8	12	
5	Old Boys	12	5	1	6	19	20	−1	11	
6	FC Bern	12	3	4	5	23	27	−4	10	
7	Nordstern Basel	12	2	1	9	22	38	−16	5	

Source: rsssf.com

== See also ==
- History of FC Basel
- List of FC Basel players
- List of FC Basel seasons

== Sources ==
- Rotblau: Jahrbuch Saison 2014/2015. Publisher: FC Basel Marketing AG. ISBN 978-3-7245-2027-6
- Die ersten 125 Jahre. Publisher: Josef Zindel im Friedrich Reinhardt Verlag, Basel. ISBN 978-3-7245-2305-5
- FCB team 1916–17 at fcb-archiv.ch
- Switzerland 1916-17 at RSSSF
