= 1910–11 FC Basel season =

FC Basel
1910–11 season
- Chairman: Ernst-Alfred Thalmann
- First team coach: Emil Hasler (as team captain)
- Ground: Landhof, Basel
- Serie A: Group Stage: Third
- Anglo Cup: Quarterfinals
- Top goalscorer: n/a (Note: The player lines-ups and goal scorers for 10 of the 14 league games in the 1910–11 season are unknown or incomplete.)
- Average home league attendance: n/a

The FC Basel 1910–11 season was their eighteenth season since the club's foundation. The club's chairman was Ernst-Alfred Thalmann, it was his ninth presidential term, his third term in succession. FC Basel played their home games in the Landhof.

== Overview ==
By the 1 January 1911 there were 63 clubs with 7157 members that were organized in the Swiss Football Association.

Emil Hasler was team captain for the third consequtive season and as captain he led the team trainings and was responsible for the line-ups. During the 1910–11 season Basel played a total of 38 matches, 23 friendly games, 12 in the domestic league and three games in the Anglo-Cup. Of the 23 friendlies Basel won eleven, drawing three and they were defeated nine times. In the pre-season Basel travelled to Germany once, to play a 4–3 victory against Freiburger FC. The other pre-seasons were played against Swiss teams.

During the winter break the team again travelled north and played a 2–2 draw against the Würzburger Kickers on Christmas day and on boxing day a 5–0 win against Ludwigshafener FG 1903. In January the team travelled to France and played a 5–0 win against Mulhouse. In March they travelled to Germany and travelled home with a 1–6 defeat after their game with Mannheimer FG 1896. At the end of season they travelled to Germany once more. On Easter Sunday they lost 2–4 against FV 1900 Kaiserslautern and on Easter Monday 0–1 against Mannheimer FC Phönix 02. One week later the team came home after a 1–5 defeat against Freiburger FC and yet another week later after a 2–3 defeat against Strassburger FV.

Basel also played hosts to two British teams. They lost at home in the Landhof 1–7 against Newcastle United and 1–5 against Celtic. All together ten games were played abroad and five other away games were played in Switzerland against Swiss teams. Eight of the friendlies were played at home, four of the guest teams came from abroad, three guest teams came from clubs in Switzerland.

The other friendly match was played against the Switzerland national football team on Sunday 26 February 1911. The national time line up was: Von Gunten; Adamina, Müller; Leuner, Rubli I, Ehrbar; Collet, Rubli II, Wyss, Kaiser, Weiss. Basel played with a strengthened team in following line up: Flückiger (Aarau); Moll, Wenger; Albicker II, Hartmann (Biel), Albicker I; Wunderle, Renand (Servette), Kaltenbach, Hasler, Eugen Strauss (La Chaux-de-Fonds). Team Basel won the game 3–0 thanks to two goals from Renand and one from Stauss.

The Swiss Serie A 1910–11 was again divided into three regional groups. Basel were allocated to the Central group together with local rivals Old Boys. The other teams playing in the Central group were Biel-Bienne, FC Bern, Young Boys and Stella Fribourg. The Young Boys won the group and continued to the finals and eventually won the championship. Three other local teams Nordstern Basel, Concordia Basel and FC Liestal played in the Swiss Serie B, together with Basel's reserve team.

In the Anglo-Cup Basel were drawn against two of these lower classed locals. In the round of 32 away against FC Liestal, which ended with a 7–1 victory and in the round of 16 against Concordia, in which Basel ended victors 2–0. In the Quarterfinals Basel were drawn away from home against Young Boys Bern. This game ended with a 2–8 defeat. Young Boys went on to win the final against Servette.

== Players ==
Squad members

Note: Flags indicate national team as defined under FIFA eligibility rules; some limited exceptions apply. Players may hold more than one non-FIFA nationality.

No.	Pos.	Nation	Player
—	GK		Albert Meyer
—	GK	(Switzerland) SUI	Fridolin Wenger
—	GK		A.H. Würgler
—	DF	(Switzerland) SUI	Hermann Moll
—	MF	(Switzerland) SUI	Fritz Albicker (II)
—	MF	(Switzerland) SUI	Wilhelm 'Willy' Geisser
—	MF	(Switzerland) SUI	Emil Hasler
—	MF	(Switzerland) SUI	Ernst Kaltenbach
—	FW	(Switzerland) SUI	Christian Albicker (I)
—	FW		Rudolf Bredschneider

No.	Pos.	Nation	Player
—	FW	(Switzerland) SUI	Karl Ibach
—	FW		Camille Meyer
—	FW	(Sweden) SWE	Birger Persson
—	FW	(Switzerland) SUI	Karl Wunderle
—	MF	(Switzerland) SUI	Ernst Gossweiler (II)
—		(Switzerland) SUI	? Weiss
—		(Switzerland) SUI	? Riesterer
—			? Gürtler
—			Hans Enzmann
—			Ed. Buser

== Results ==
Legend

Win Draw Loss

=== Friendly matches ===
==== Pre- and mid-season ====
21 August 1910 Pre-season	Freiburger FC	3–4	Basel	Freiburg im Breisgau
	Goal	Summary	Goal

28 August 1910 Pre-season	Concordia Basel	3–3	Basel	Basel
15:00	Kalt (1:0); Lüscher (2:3); Hermann (3:3)	Summary	(1:1) (1:2) (1:3)

4 September 1910 Pre-season	Winterthur	0–2	Basel	Winterthur
		Summary	(0:1); Hasler 80' (0:2)

11 September 1910 Pre-season	Servette	1–5	Basel	Geneva
	Renand 89' (1:5)	Summary	(0:1) Wunderle (0:2) (0:3) (0:4) (0:5)	Referee: H. Garonne (Genf)

18 September 1910 Pre-season	FV Baden-Baden	0–7	Basel	Baden-Baden
		Summary	(0:1) (0:2) (0:3) Kaltenbach (0:4) (0:5) Wunderle (0:6) Weiss (0:7) Hasler

25 September 1910 Pre-season	Basel	4–1	Zürich	Landhof, Basel
15:00	(1:0) (2:0) (3:0); Hasler (4:1)	Summary	(3:1) Haberstock

2 October 1910 Mid-season	La Chaux-de-Fonds	3–2	Basel	La Chaux-de-Fonds
	Goal	Summary	Goal

==== Winter break to end of season ====
25 December 1910 Winter break	Würzburger Kickers	2–2	Basel	Würzburg
	Goal	Summary	Goal

26 December 1910 Winter break	Ludwigshafener FG 1903	0–5	Basel	Ludwigshafen
		Summary	(0:1) (0:2) (0:3) (0:4) (0:5)

1 January 1911 Winter break	Basel	3–2	St. Gallen	Landhof, Basel
	Kaltenbach (1:2); Hasler (2:2); Kaltenbach (2:3)	Summary	(0:1) Senn (0:2) Neumeyer

8 January 1911 Winter break	Mulhouse	0–5	Basel	Mulhouse
		Summary	(0:1) (0:2) (0:3) (0:4) (0:5)

26 February 1911 Mid-season	Basel	3–0	Switzerland national football team	Landhof, Basel
	Renand (1:0); Renand (2:0); Stauss (3:0)	Summary		Referee: Escher Zürich

5 March 1911 Mid-season	Mannheimer FG 1896	6–1	Basel	Mannheim
	5' (1:0); Leissing (2:0); Leissing (3:0); Leissing (4:0); Leissing (5:0); Leissing (6:0)	Summary	(6:1) Persson

12 March 1911 Mid-season	Basel	0–2	Strassburger FV	Landhof, Basel
15:00		Summary	(0:1) (0:2)	Referee: Ramseyer Basel

2 April 1911 Mid-season	St. Gallen	1–1	Basel	Espenmoos, St. Gallen
15:00	Maschmeyer (1:0)	Summary	(1:1) Kaltenbach	Referee: Vonwiller St. Gallen

16 April 1911 End of season	FV 1900 Kaiserslautern	4–2	Basel	Haardtwalde Kaiserslautern
	Goal	Summary	Albicker (I)

17 April 1911 End of season	Mannheimer FC Phönix 02	1–0	Basel	Mannheim
	(1:0)	Summary

23 April 1911 End of season	Freiburger FC	5–1	Basel	Freiburg im Breisgau
	15' (pen. 1:0) (o.g. 2:0); Hensler (3:0); Burkart (4:0) (5:1)	Summary	(4:1)

30 April 1911 End of season	Strassburger FV	3–2	Basel	Velodrome, Strassburg
	(1:0) (2:0) (3:1)	Summary	(2:1) Kaltenbach (3:2) Kaltenbach

21 May 1910 End of season	Basel	1–7	Newcastle United	Landhof, Basel
16:00	Hasler (pen. 1:1)	Summary	(0:1) (1:2) (1:3) (1:4) (1:5) (1:6) (1:7)	Attendance: 3,500; Referee: Winkler Freiburger FC

27 May 1911 End of season	Basel	1–5	Celtic	Landhof, Basel
17:30	Kaltenbach (1:0)	Summary	(1:1) (1:2) McMenemy (1:3) McMenemy (1:4) McMenemy (1:5) Johnstone	Attendance: 1,200; Referee: M'Maily (Glasgow)

5 June 1911 End of season	Basel	5–3	1. FC Pforzheim	Landhof, Basel
15:00	Goal	Summary	Goal

25 June 1911 End of season	Basel	4–0	St. Gallen	Landhof, Basel
	Kaltenbach (1:0); Füllemann (2:0 o.g.) (3:0) (4:0)	Summary

=== Serie A ===
==== Central group results ====
9 October 1910 Round 1	Aarau	5–2	Basel	Aarau
	9' (1:0) (2:1) (3:1); 70' (4:1) (5:1)	Summary	(pen. 1:1) (5:2)	Referee: (Switzerland) D. Wenger (FC Old Boys Basel)

16 October 1910 Round 2	Basel	0–2	Young Boys	Landhof, Basel
		Summary	(0:1); 55' (0:2)

23 October 1910 Round 3	Stella Fribourg	2–5	Basel	Fribourg
	Goal	Summary	Goal

30 October 1910 Round 4	Basel	3–3	Old Boys	Landhof, Basel
15:00	(1:0); Hasler (2:3); Wunderle (3:3)	Summary	(1:1) (1:2) (1:3)	Attendance: 1,200; Referee: (Switzerland) Kratz Zürich

13 November 1910 Round 5	Basel	3–1	FC Bern	Landhof, Basel
15:00	76' (1:1); Wunderle (2:1) (pen. 3:1)	Summary	Hofer (0:1)	Attendance: 1,000

20 November 1910 Round 6	Basel	3–1	Biel-Bienne	Landhof, Basel
	Hasler (1:0); Riesterer (2:0); Hasler (3:0)	Summary	(pen. 3:1) Hartmann

27 November 1910 Round 7	Basel	1–4	Aarau	Landhof, Basel
	Kaltenbach (1:3)	Summary	(0:1) (0:2) (0:3) (1:4)	Attendance: 1,000; Referee: (Switzerland) Kratz (FC Zürich)

4 December 1910 Round 8	Young Boys	4–1	Basel	Spitalacker, Bern
	Goal	Summary	Goal

11 December 1910 Round 9	Basel	3–1	Stella Fribourg	Landhof, Basel
15:00	Wunderle (1:0); Hasler (2:1); Kaltenbach (3:1)	Summary	(1:1) Freely	Referee: (Switzerland) von Gunten La Chaux-de-Fonds

5 February 1911 Round 10	Old Boys	2–4	Basel	Margarethenwiese Basel
	(1:1) (2:4)	Summary	(0:1) Kaltenbach (1:2) (1:3) Kaltenbach (1:4) Kaltenbach	Referee: (Switzerland) Sandoz La Chaux-de-Fonds

19 March 1911 Round 11	FC Bern	4–3	Basel	Bern
14:40	Kramer 20' (1:0); Schaffter 25' (2:0); Payot (3:1); Schaffter (4:3)	Summary	(2:1); 50' (3:2); 58' (3:3)	Referee: (Switzerland) Grünig Biel-Bienne

9 April 1911 Round 12	Biel-Bienne	7–4	Basel	Biel-Bienne
	Sigrist (1:1) (2:1) (3:1) (4:2) (5:4) (6:4) (7:4)	Summary	(0:1) (3:2) (4:3) (4:4)	Referee: (Switzerland) W. Lehmann

==== Central group league table ====
Pos	Team	Pld	W	D	L	GF	GA	GD	Pts	Qualification
1	Young Boys Bern	12	10	2	0	45	10	+35	22	Advance to finals
2	FC Aarau	12	10	0	2	52	16	+36	20	
3	FC Basel	12	5	1	6	32	36	−4	11	
4	FC Biel	12	4	3	5	28	39	−11	11	
5	FC Bern	12	4	1	7	22	29	−7	9	
6	Old Boys Basel	12	2	3	7	27	42	−15	7	
7	Stella Fribourg	12	2	0	10	17	51	−34	4	

Source: rsssf

=== Anglo-Cup ===
26 March 1911 Round of 32	FC Liestal	1–7	Basel	Liestal
	Goal	Summary	Goal

7 May 1911 Round of 16	Basel	2–0	Concordia Basel	Landhof, Basel
15:00	Kaltenbach (pen. 1:0); Kaltenbach (2:0)	Summary		Referee: (Switzerland) Hörtig Young Fellows Zürich

8 June 1911 Quarterfinal	Young Boys	8–2	Basel	Bern
	Goal	Summary	Goal

== See also ==
- History of FC Basel
- List of FC Basel players
- List of FC Basel seasons

== Notes ==
=== Footnotes ===
Incomplete league matches 1910–11 season: Aarau-FCB, FCB-YB, Stella-FCB, FCB-Biel, FCB-Aarau, YB-FCB, FCB-Stella, OB-FCB, Bern-FCB and Biel-FCB

== Sources ==
- Rotblau: Jahrbuch Saison 2014/2015. Publisher: FC Basel Marketing AG. ISBN 978-3-7245-2027-6
- Die ersten 125 Jahre. Publisher: Josef Zindel im Friedrich Reinhardt Verlag, Basel. ISBN 978-3-7245-2305-5
- FC Basel team 1910-11 at fcb-archiv.ch
- Switzerland 1910-11 at RSSSF
