= 1909–10 FC Basel season =

FC Basel
1909–10 season
- Chairman: Ernst-Alfred Thalmann
- First team coach: Emil Hasler (as team captain)
- Ground: Landhof, Basel
- Serie A: Group Stage: Fifth
- Anglo Cup: Quarterfinals
- Top goalscorer: n/a (Note: The player lines-ups and goal scorers for 6 of the 10 league games in the 1909–10 season are unknown or incomplete.)
- Average home league attendance: n/a

The FC Basel 1909–10 season was their seventeenth season since the club was founded on 15 November 1893. The club's chairman was once again Ernst-Alfred Thalmann, it was his eighth presidential term. FC Basel played their home games in the Landhof.

== Overview ==
In the 1909–10 season 99 teams took part in the Swiss championships organised by the Swiss Football Association. In the Serie A there were 19 teams. From the regional point of view these were FC Basel and FC Old Boys Basel. In the Serie B there were 41 teams, from the region Nordstern Basel, Concordia Basel, FC Liestal and the second teams from FCB and OB. In the Serie C there were 39 teams, FC Breite Basel and FC Rosenthal Basel, as well as second and third teams.

Emil Hasler was team captain for the second season in a row and as captain he led the team trainings and was responsible for the line-ups. During the 1909–10 season Basel played a total of 37 matches, 25 friendly games, 10 in the domestic league and two in the newly created Anglo-Cup. Of the 25 friendlies 11 were played in the Landhof. The team travelled to France to play a good victory against FC Hagenau and to Germany to play Freiburger FC, but here they were defeated. During the winter break they again travelled to Germany. They played a draw with 1. FC Pforzheim on Christmas day and on boxing day were defeated by a combined team with players from Mannheimer FG Union and FC Phönix Mannheim. The team again travelled to France in January, playing a draw with Strassburger FV. Over Easter the team played a tour in Germany, losing 4–0 against Stuttgarter Kickers, losing 5–3 against 1. FC Nürnberg on Good Friday and losing twice against Deutscher FC Prag, 2–1 on Easter Sunday and 4–1 on Easter Monday. In total 8 games were won, 6 six were drawn and 11 ended in a defeat.

The Swiss Serie A 1909–10 was divided into three regional groups, seven team in the east group, six in the central and six in the west group. Basel were allocated to the central group together with local rivals Old Boys. The other teams playing in the Serie A central group were Luzern, Biel-Bienne, FC Bern and Young Boys. Basel ended the season in the fifth position in the group table, five points ahead of Luzern, who were relegated and three points behind the Young Boys, who won the group. YB continued to the finals and played against east group winners Aarau and west group winners Servette. YB won both games and became Swiss champions for the second time in a row.

The first Anglo-Cup was played this season. In the round of 16 on 10 April 1910 Basel won against Young Fellows Zürich, but were beaten by St. Gallen in the quarterfinals. St. Gallen continued to the final, but were beaten in the replay by Young Boys.

== Players ==
Squad members

Note: Flags indicate national team as defined under FIFA eligibility rules; some limited exceptions apply. Players may hold more than one non-FIFA nationality.

No.	Pos.	Nation	Player
—	GK		Albert Meyer
—	GK	SUI	Fridolin Wenger
—	DF	SUI	Ernst Amstein
—	DF	SUI	Hermann Moll
—	MF	SUI	Wilhelm 'Willy' Geisser
—	MF	GER	Josef Goldschmidt
—	MF	SUI	Paul Gürtler
—	MF	SUI	Emil Hasler
—	MF	SUI	Ernst Kaltenbach

No.	Pos.	Nation	Player
—	MF		Max Palatini
—	MF	SUI	Luigi Persenico
—	FW	SUI	Christian Albicker (I)
—	FW		Rudolf Bredschneider
—	FW	SUI	Rudolf GossweilerI (I)
—	FW	SUI	Karl Gossweiler (II)
—	FW	SUI	Ernst Gossweiler (III)
—	FW	SUI	Gottfried Gunst
—	FW	SUI	Karl Wunderle

== Results ==
Legend

Win Draw Loss

=== Friendly matches ===
==== Pre- and mid-season ====
15 August 1909 Pre-season	Concordia Basel	1 – 12	Basel	Basel
	Goal	Summary	Goal

5 September 1909 Pre-season	FC Hagenau	1 – 5	Basel	Hagenau
	Goal	Summary	Goal

12 September 1909 Pre-season	Basel	4 – 1	Baden	Landhof, Basel
	Goal	Summary	Goal

19 September 1909 Pre-season	Freiburger FC	4 – 2	Basel	Freiburg im Breisgau
	Goal	Summary	Goal

3 October 1909 Mid-season	Basel	5 – 2	Cantonal Neuchâtel	Landhof, Basel
15:00	(1:0) (2:0) (3:0) (4:0) (5:1)	Summary	(pen. 4:1) (5:2)

10 October 1909 Mid-season	Basel	2 – 4	Winterthur	Landhof, Basel
15:00	Hasler (1:0); Goldschmidt (2:2)	Summary	(o.g. 1:1) (1:2) Koblet (2:3) (2:4) Keller	Referee: Kupferschmid (Old Boys)

21 November 1909 Mid-season	Basel	3 – 4	Concordia Basel	Landhof, Basel
	Goal	Summary	Goal

5 December 1909 Mid-season	La Chaux-de-Fonds	3 – 6	Basel	La Chaux-de-Fonds
	(1:5) (2:5) (3:5)	Summary	(0:1) Gürtler (0:2) Hasler (0:3) Hasler (0:5) Kaltenbach (3:6) Gossweiler II

==== Winter break to end of season ====
19 December 1909 Winter break	Basel	4 – 4	Young Boys	Landhof, Basel
15:00	Wunderle (1:0); Wunderle (2:2); Gürtler (3:4); Moll (4:4)	Summary	(1:1) Meister (1:2) (2:3) (o.g. 2:4) Amstein

25 December 1909 Winter break	1. FC Pforzheim	2 – 2	Basel	Pforzheim
	Schweikert (1:0)	Summary	(1:1) Wunderle (1:2) Moll

26 December 1909 Winter break	Mannheimer FG Union/FC Phönix Mannheim combined team	4 – 3	Basel	Mannheim
	(1:0) (pen. 2:2) (3:2) (4:2)	Summary	(1:1) Moll (1:2) (4:3)

2 January 1910 Winter break	Basel	10 – 1	Nordstern Basel	Landhof, Basel
	Goal	Summary	5' (0:1)

9 January 1910 Winter break	Basel	1 – 5	Servette	Landhof, Basel
15:00	(1:0)	Summary	(1:1) Dessaules (1:2) (1:3) Renand (1:4) Morier (o.g. 1:2)	Attendance: 1,000

16 January 1910 Winter break	Strassburger FV	3 – 3	Basel	Akademiker-Platz, Strassburg
	(o.g. 1:1) (2:1); 80' (3:3)	Summary	(0:1) Gürtler (2:2) Gossweiler; 70' (2:3)	Referee: Graef Strassburger FV

6 March 1910 Mid-season	Basel	2 – 2	Winterthur	Landhof, Basel
15:00	Wunderle (1:1); Moll (2:2)	Summary	(0:1) (0:2)	Referee: Ramseyer Basel

20 March 1910 Mid-season	Stuttgarter Kickers	4 – 0	Basel	Stuttgart
	10' (1:0) (2:0); Löble (3:0) (4:0)	Summary

25 March 1910 Mid-season	1. FC Nürnberg	5 – 3	Basel	Nürnberg
	(1:1) (2:2) (3:3) (pen. 4:3) (5:3)	Summary	(0:1) Gossweiler (1:2) (2:3) Moll

27 March 1910 Mid-season	Deutscher FC Prag	2 – 1	Basel	Prague
	(1:0) (2:0)	Summary	(2:1) Gürtler

28 March 1910 Mid-season	Deutscher FC Prag	4 – 1	Basel	Prague
	(o.g. 1:0) (2:1) (3:1) (4:1)	Summary	(1:1) Gürtler

29 April 1910 End of season	Basel	0 – 3	The Pirates FC London	Landhof, Basel
17:00		Summary	(0:1) (0:2) (0:3)

8 May 1910 End of season	FV Baden-Baden	4 – 2	Basel	Baden-Baden
	Goal	Summary	Goal

15 May 1910 End of season	FC Wacker München	3 – 3	Basel	Munich
	(1:3) (2:3) (3:3)	Summary	(pen. 0:1) Kaltenbach (0:2) Moll (0:3) Wunderle

16 May 1910 End of season	FC Wacker München	3 – 5 (a.e.t.)	Basel	Munich
	(1:1) (1:2) (3:3)	Summary	(0:1) Hasler (2:2) (2:3) (3:4) Kaltenbach (3:5) Gunst

22 May 1910 End of season	Basel	2 – 2	Freiburger FC	Landhof, Basel
16:00	(1:0); Kaltenbach (2:1)	Summary	(1:1) (2:2)

4 June 1910 End of season	Basel	6 – 0	Concordia Basel	Landhof, Basel
18:00	Hasler (1:0); Hasler (2:0); Hasler (3:0); Kaltenbach (4:0); Kaltenbach (5:0) (6:0)	Summary

=== Serie A ===
==== Central group results ====
17 October 1909 Round 1	Basel	7 – 0	Luzern	Landhof, Basel
15:00	(1:0) (2:0) (3:0) (4:0) (5:0) (6:0) (7:0)	Summary		Referee: (Switzerland) R. Seifert (Old Boys)

24 October 1909 Round 2	Young Boys	1 – 2	Basel	Spitalacker, Bern
14:30	18' (1:0)	Summary	(1:1) Wunderle (pen. 1:2) Hasler	Referee: (Switzerland) Sevin (Cantonal Neuchâtel)

31 October 1909 Round 3	Basel	2 – 4	Biel-Bienne	Landhof, Basel
15:00	Hasler (1:1) (2:4)	Summary	(pen. 0:1) Lempen (1:2) (1:3) (1:4)

7 November 1909 Round 4	Old Boys	3 – 3	Basel	Margarethenwiese, Basel
15:00	Niggli 18' (1:0); Buser (2:1); Winter (3:3)	Summary	(1:1) Hasler (2:2) Wunderle (2:3) Gossweiler II	Referee: (Switzerland) Rüegg

14 November 1909 Round 5	Basel	2 – 3	Bern	Landhof, Basel
15:00	(1:1); Gossweiler II (2:2)	Summary	(0:1) Hofer (1:2) Schäfter (o.g. 2:3) Meyer

12 December 1909 Round 6	Luzern	1 – 2	Basel	Luzern
	10' (1:0)		(1:1) Kaltenbach (1:2) Gossweiler II

14 February 1910 Round 7	Basel	1 – 4	Old Boys	Landhof, Basel
15:00	Hasler (1:0)	Summary	(1:1) Buser III (1:2) (1:3) (1:4)	Referee: (Switzerland) Escher Zürich

20 February 1910 Round 8	Bern	2 – 3	Basel	Kirchenfeld, Bern
15:00	Brugger (1:0); Beuchat I (2:1)	Summary	(1:1) Hasler (2:2) (2:3)	Referee: (Switzerland) Haslebacher (Montriond)

17 April 1910 Round 9	Basel	0 – 4	Young Boys	Landhof, Basel
15:00		Summary	(0:1) Walter (0:2) Meister (0:3) Weiss (0:4) Kaiser	Referee: (Switzerland) Schlegel (FC Zürich)

24 April 1910 Round 10	Biel-Bienne	2 – 2	Basel	Biel/Bienne
	Goal	Summary	Goal

==== Central group league table ====
Pos	Team	Pld	W	D	L	GF	GA	GD	Pts	Qualification
1	Young Boys Bern	10	6	1	3	38	18	+20	13	Advance to finals
2	Old Boys Basel	10	4	3	3	26	23	+3	11	
3	FC Bern	10	4	3	3	22	20	+2	11	
4	FC Biel	10	4	2	4	27	23	+4	10	
5	FC Basel	10	4	2	4	24	24	0	10	
6	FC Lucerne	10	2	1	7	15	44	−29	5	Relegated

Source: rsssf

=== Anglo-Cup ===
10 April 1910 Round of 16	Basel	4 – 2	Young Fellows Zürich	Landhof, Basel
15:00	Hasler (1:0); Kaltenbach (pen. 2:0); Moll (3:0); Hasler (4:0)	Summary	(4:1) (4:2)

29 May 1910 Quarterfinal	St. Gallen	2 – 1	Basel	St. Gallen
	Krämer (1:0); Grunder (2:1)	Summary	(1:1)	Referee: (Switzerland) H. W. Koch

== See also ==
- History of FC Basel
- List of FC Basel players
- List of FC Basel seasons

== Notes ==
=== Footnotes ===
Incomplete league matches 1909–1910 season: YB-FCB, FCB-Biel, Luzern-FCB, Bern-FCB, FCB-YB, Biel-FCB

=== Sources ===
- Rotblau: Jahrbuch Saison 2014/2015. Publisher: FC Basel Marketing AG. ISBN 978-3-7245-2027-6
- Die ersten 125 Jahre. Publisher: Josef Zindel im Friedrich Reinhardt Verlag, Basel. ISBN 978-3-7245-2305-5
- FCB team 1909-10 at fcb-archiv.ch
- Switzerland 1909-10 at RSSSF
