= 1908–09 FC Basel season =

FC Basel
1908–09 season
- Chairman: Ernst-Alfred Thalmann
- First team coach: Emil Hasler (as team captain)
- Ground: Landhof, Basel
- Serie A: Group Stage: Sixth
- Top goalscorer: n/a (Note: The player lines-ups and goal scorers for 10 of the 14 league games in the 1908–09 season are unknown or incomplete.)
- Average home league attendance: n/a

The FC Basel 1908–09 season was their sixteenth season since the club was formed. The club's chairman was Ernst-Alfred Thalmann, it was his seventh presidential term. FC Basel played their home games in the Landhof.

== Overview ==
Daniel Hug, who had been team captain for many years, left the club and transferred to Genoa CFC as professional. Emil Hasler was the new team captain and as captain he led the team trainings and was responsible for the line-ups. Basel played 14 friendly games and 14 matches in the Swiss domestic league. Of the 14 friendly games that the team played, four were won and 10 ended in defeats. Nine games were played in Switzerland, six of which at home in the Landhof. The other games were played in Italy, both against Genoa as transfer compensation for Hug, and four in Germany, each once against Karlsruher FV, Britannia Frankfurt, Mannheimer VfB Union and Freiburger FC in Freiburg im Breisgau.

The 1908–09 Serie A was divided into two regional groups, an east group with eight teams and a west group with seven teams. Basel were allocated to the east group, together with local rivals Old Boys Basel and Aarau, Zürich, Grasshopper Club, Young Fellows Zürich, Winterthur, and last but not least, St. Gallen.

There were a number of changes in the Basel team. As mentioned Daniel Hug moved to Italy to play for Genoa CFC. Players such as Dr. Siegfried Pfeiffer, Ernst-Alfred Thalmann, Alfred Stöhrmann and Max Senn left the first team and were replaced by younger members. The newly formed team started the season in the worst possible way, six defeats in a row. The two 1–6 away defeats against Old Boys and Zürich, the 0–6 defeat away against Winterthur, together with the 1–2 home result against Young Fellows Zürich, the 4–5 home defeat against Aarau were only the beginning of the evil. The 2–9 home defeat against Grasshopper Club remains the highest home defeat in history until today. It was not until the seventh round, with a 3–2 win against St. Gallen on 22 November 1908, that Basel achieved their first points. After that they were only defeated once more, on 13 December 1908, a home defeat against Winterthur. Basel ended the season in the East group in sixth position.

Winterthur won the east group, obtaining 25 points seven more than St. Gallen in second position in the league table. But Winterthur were defeated 0–1 by Young Boys Bern in the championship final, which was played on 6 June 2009 in Basel.

== Players ==
Squad members

Note: Flags indicate national team as defined under FIFA eligibility rules; some limited exceptions apply. Players may hold more than one non-FIFA nationality.

No.	Pos.	Nation	Player
—	GK	(Switzerland) SUI	Albert Meyer
—	GK		? Persenico (from reserve team)
—	GK	(Switzerland) SUI	Fridolin Wenger
—	DF	(Switzerland) SUI	Ernst Amstein (from reserve team)
—	DF	(Switzerland) SUI	Hermann Moll
—	MF	(Germany) GER	Josef Goldschmidt
—	MF	(Switzerland) SUI	Emil Hasler
—	MF	(Switzerland) SUI	Max Palatini
—	FW	(Switzerland) SUI	Rudolf Bredschneider
—	FW	(Switzerland) SUI	Rudolf Gossweiler (I)
—	FW	(Switzerland) SUI	Karl Gossweiler (II)
—	FW		? Kunz

No.	Pos.	Nation	Player
—		(Switzerland) SUI	? Albicker
—		(Switzerland) SUI	Eduard Bauer (from reserve team)
—			Robert Francey
—			? Glenck (from reserve team)
—		(Switzerland) SUI	? Gossweiler
—			? Gürtler
—			? Gürtler (I)
—			? Gürtler (III)
—		(Switzerland) SUI	Werner Keller
—			H. Légeret
—			Gustav Riedlin
—			Emil Vogt

== Results ==
Legend

Win Draw Loss

=== Friendly matches ===
==== Pre-season ====
13 September 1908 Pre-season	Basel	0 – 5	Karlsruher FV	Landhof, Basel
15:00		Summary	(0:1) (0:2) (0:3) (0:4) (0:5)

27 September 1908 Pre-season	FC Cantonal Neuchâtel	3 – 4	Basel	Colombier, Neuchâtel
14:30	Goal	Summary	Goal

==== Winter break to end of season ====
27 December 1908 Winter break	La Chaux-de-Fonds	5 – 1	Basel	Parc des Sports, La Chaux-de-Fonds
14:30	3' (1:0); Goldschmidt (o.g. 2:0); 20' (3:0) (4:1) (5:1)	Summary	(3:1) Gossweiler

1 January 1909 Winter break	Genoa	4 – 2	Basel	Genoa
	Girou (1:2); Francey (o.g. 2:2) (3:2) (4:2)	Summary	(0:1) Glenck (0:2) Persenico

3 January 1909 Winter break	Genoa	5 – 2	Basel	Genoa
	(1:0) (2:2) (3:2) (4:2) (5:2)	Summary	(2:1) Bauer (2:2) Albicker

24 January 1909 Winter break	Basel	4 – 0	Nordstern	Landhof, Basel
15:00	(1:0) (2:0) (3:0) (4:0)	Summary

14 February 1909 Winter break	Basel	1 – 2	La Chaux-de-Fonds	Landhof, Basel
15:00	Légeret 1:1'	Summary	20' (0:1) Reichen (1:2)	Referee: Kupferschmid

21 February 1909 Winter break	Young Boys	5 – 0	Basel	Spitalacker, Bern
14:30	Rubli (1:0); Kämpfer (2:0) (3:0) (4:0) (5:0)	Summary		Attendance: 700

21 March 1909 Mid-season	Karlsruher FV	8 – 0	Basel	Karlsruhe
	(1:0) (2:0) (3:0) (4:0) (5:0) (6:0) (7:0) (8:0)	Summary

28 March 1909 Mid-season	Basel	4 – 0	Bern	Landhof, Basel
	Moll (1:0); Wenger (2:0); Wenger (3:0); Keller (4:0)	Summary		Referee: John André (FC Basel)

11 April 1909 Mid-season	Britannia Frankfurt	3 – 2	Basel	Frankfurt
	(pen. 1:2) (2:2) (3:2)	Summary	(0:1) (0:2)

12 April 1909 Mid-season	Mannheimer VfB Union	3 – 2	Basel	Mannheim
	(1:0); 46' (2:2) (3:2)	Summary	(1:1); 35' (1:2)

9 May 1909 End of season	Freiburger FC	1 – 4	Basel	Freiburg im Breisgau
	Goal	Summary	Goal

31 May 1909 End of season	Basel	1 – 4	Karlsruher FV	Landhof, Basel
	Wenger 63' (1:3)	Summary	10' (0:1); Hirsch 20' (0:2); 51' (0:3) (1:4)

27 June 1909 End of season	Basel	5 – 4	Karlsruher FV	Landhof, Basel
	Goal	Summary	Goal

=== Serie A ===
==== East group results ====
11 October 1908 Round 1	Basel	1 – 2	Young Fellows Zürich	Landhof, Basel
15:00	Gossweiler (I) 20' (1:0)	Summary	(1:1) Staub (1:2) Burki	Referee: (Switzerland) Rudolf Schwarz (Old Boys)

18 October 1908 Round 2	Old Boys	6 – 1	Basel	Margarethenwiese, Basel
1:00	Goal	Summary	Goal	Referee: (Switzerland) Lalive

25 October 1908 Round 3	Basel	2 – 9	Grasshopper Club	Landhof, Basel
15:00	Hasler (pen. 1:3) (2:3)	Summary	(0:1) (0:2); Taylor (0:3) (2:4) (2:5) (2:6) (2:7) (2:8) (2:9)

1 November 1908 Round 4	Zürich	6 – 1	Basel	Zürich
	(1:0) (2:0) (3:0) (4:0) (5:0) (6:0)	Summary	(6:1)	Referee: (Switzerland) Hüni (Grasshopper Club)

8 November 1908 Round 5	Basel	4 – 5	Aarau	Landhof, Basel
15:00	(1:5) (2:5) (3:5) (4:5)	Summary	(0:1) (0:2) (0:3) (0:4) (0:5)

15 November 1908 Round 6	Winterthur	6 – 0	Basel	Winterthur
	10' (1:0) (2:0) (3:0) (4:0) (5:0) (6:0)	Summary		Referee: (Switzerland) Fritz Seiffert (Old Boys)

22 November 1908 Round 7	Basel	3 – 2	St. Gallen	Landhof, Basel
15:00	Goal	Summary	Goal	Referee: (Switzerland) Rudolf Schwarz (Old Boys)

29 November 1908 Round 8	Young Fellows Zürich	2 – 2	Basel	Zürich
15:00	Staub (I) (1:1) (2:2)	Summary	(0:1) (1:2)	Referee: (Switzerland) Koch (St. Gallen)

13 December 1908 Round 9	Basel	1 – 3	Winterthur	Landhof, Basel
	Goal	Summary	Goal

20 December 1908 Round 10	Basel	5 – 5	Old Boys	Landhof, Basel
14:00	Goal	Summary	Goal	Referee: (Switzerland) Lang (Winterthur)

28 February 1909 Round 11	Basel	4 – 3	Zürich	Landhof, Basel
15:00	Keller 10' (1:0); Keller 20' (2:1); Keller (3:1); Gossweiler (4:3)	Summary	15' (1:1) (3:2) Schlegel; 80' (3:3)

18 April 1909 Round 12	Grasshopper Club	3 – 7	Basel	Zürich
	Goal	Summary	Goal	Referee: (Switzerland) Keller (Zürich)

25 April 1909 Round 13	St. Gallen	3 – 3	Basel	St. Gallen
	Goal	Summary	Goal

2 May 1909 Round 14	Aarau	2 – 5	Basel	Aarau
	Goal	Summary	Goal	Referee: (Switzerland) Schrader (Grasshopper Club)

==== East group league table ====
Pos	Team	Pld	W	D	L	GF	GA	GD	Pts	Qualification
1	FC Winterthur	14	11	3	0	59	17	+42	25	Advance to finals
2	FC St. Gallen	14	8	2	4	53	35	+18	18	
3	Old Boys Basel	14	8	2	4	51	44	+7	18	
4	FC Aarau	14	7	2	5	48	46	+2	16	
5	Young Fellows Zürich	14	5	2	7	46	48	−2	12	
6	FC Basel	14	4	3	7	39	57	−18	11	
7	FC Zürich	14	4	0	10	38	55	−17	8	
8	Grasshopper Club Zürich	14	2	0	12	23	55	−32	4	

Source: rsssf

== See also ==
- History of FC Basel
- List of FC Basel players
- List of FC Basel seasons

== Notes ==
=== Footnotes ===
Incomplete league matches 1908–1909 season: FCB-YF, FCZ-FCB, FCB-Aarau, FCW-FCB, FCB-FCSG, YF-FCB, FCB-FCB, FCB-OB, GC-FCB, FCSG-FCB

=== Sources ===
- Rotblau: Jahrbuch Saison 2014/2015. Publisher: FC Basel Marketing AG. ISBN 978-3-7245-2027-6
- Die ersten 125 Jahre. Publisher: Josef Zindel im Friedrich Reinhardt Verlag, Basel. ISBN 978-3-7245-2305-5
- Switzerland 1908-09 at RSSSF
- FCB team 1908-09 at fcb-archiv.ch
