= 1912–13 FC Basel season =

FC Basel
1912–13 season
- Chairman: Ernst-Alfred Thalmann
- First team coach: unknown
- Ground: Landhof, Basel
- Serie A: Group Stage: 4th
- Anglo-Cup: Winners
- Top goalscorer: Christian Albicker
- Average home league attendance: n/a

The FC Basel 1912–13 season was their twentieth season since the club's foundation on 15 November 1893. The club's chairman was Ernst-Alfred Thalmann, all together it was his eleventh presidential term and his fifth season in succession. At the AGM Thalmann stood down and Karl Ibach took over. The club announced that to that point it had grown to have over 300 members at over half of them were active football players. FC Basel played their home games in the Landhof in the district Basel-Wettstein in Kleinbasel, Basel.

== Overview ==
Emil Hasler was the team captain for the fourth year running and as captain he led the trainings and was responsible for the line-ups. In their 1912–13 season Basel played a total of 37 matches, 19 were friendly games, 14 were in the domestic league and 5 in the Anglo Cup.

Of the friendly games just three were played in the Landhof, six others were away games in Switzerland and ten games were played abroad. During the pre-season the team travelled to Germany twice, played against Karlsruher FC Phönix and Freiburger FC, and travelled to France to play Strassburger FV. During the winter break the team made a tour to North Rhine-Westphalia and before Christmas played VfR Mannheim, on Christmas day played ETB Schwarz-Weiss Essen and on boxing day played Düsseldorfer FC Fortuna 1911. The team came home with two victories and one defeat. At easter the team made a tour to eastern Germany. They played against SC Erfurt on easter Sunday, against Sportlust Dresden on easter monday and against SC Wacker Leipzig the day after. At the end of the season Basel played host to English club Preston North End. Of the friendly games 10 were won, three were drawn and six ended with a defeat.

The Swiss Serie A 1912–13 was divided into three regional groups, an east, a central and a west group. Basel were allocated to the central group together with local rivals Old Boys and Nordstern Basel. The other teams playing in this group were Young Boys, FC La Chaux-de-Fonds, Étoile-Sporting FC La Chaux-de-Fonds, FC Bern and Biel-Bienne. Basel started badly, with three defeats and a draw in the first four games. Despite seven victories and one draw during the next ten games, the team could not reduce the gap to the top of the league table. Basel ended the season in fourth position. They were four points behind group winners Old Boys, who continued to the finals. Lausanne Sports won the championship. Group bottom was Biel-Bienne, who therefore entered the play-off round against relegation, in which they were successful.

The Englishman Percy Humphreys was the first professional trainer that the club FC Basel had ever employed. Prior to Humphreys signing, it had always been the team captain who had taken over the function of the trainer. Under club chairman Karl Ibach, Humphreys signed his contract and began his duties on 1 April 1913. He had previously been head-coach for Hartlepool United in the English North Eastern League.

The Anglo-Cup was a forerunner to the Swiss Cup. It was held for the fourth time this season and the first round was held on 1 May. In the first round Basel were drawn at home against lower classed Solothurn. In the second round, in the quarter-final and in the semi-final against East group teams, these being St. Gallen, Zürich and Winterthur and in that order. All these games were played at home in the Landhof and Basel won each game. In the final, which was played in the Hardau Stadium in Zürich on 29 June 1913, Basel played against lower classed Weissenbühl Bern and won 5–0. Humphreys led Basel to win their first national title. But memories of this soon faded, because the Anglo Cup was not played the following year and in fact it was discontinued completely due to World War I.

== Players ==
Squad members

Note: Flags indicate national team as defined under FIFA eligibility rules; some limited exceptions apply. Players may hold more than one non-FIFA nationality.

No.	Pos.	Nation	Player
—	GK	SUI	Fridolin Wenger
—	GK		P. Vietti
—	DF	SUI	Paul Bettex
—	DF	SUI	Hermann Moll
—	MF	SUI	Fritz Albicker (II)
—	MF	SUI	Wilhelm 'Willy' Geisser
—	MF	GER	Josef Goldschmidt
—	MF	SUI	Ernst Gossweiler
—	MF	SUI	Emil Hasler
—	MF	SUI	Ernst Kaltenbach

No.	Pos.	Nation	Player
—	MF	SUI	Emil Schreyer
—	FW	SUI	Christian Albicker (I)
—	FW		Rudolf Bredschneider
—	FW	SUI	Karl Wunderle
—			Fritz Aeppli
—			Roger Breithaupt
—			Hans Kramer
—			? Riesterer
—			? Rittel
—			? Weiss

== Results ==
Legend

Win Draw Loss

=== Friendly matches ===
==== Pre-season ====
August 1912 Pre-season	Strassburger FV	0–0	Basel	Strassburg
		Summary

8 August 19112 Pre-season	Karlsruher FC Phönix	0–4	Basel	Karlsruhe
		Summary	Goal

1 September 1912 Pre-season	Freiburger FC	4–2	Basel	Freiburg im Breisgau
	Goal	Summary	Goal

22 September 1912 Pre-season	Young Fellows Zürich	0–2	Basel	Zürich
		Summary	Goal

22 September 1912 Pre-season	Aarau	1–0	Basel	Aarau
	(1:0)	Summary

==== Winter break to end of season ====
22 December 1912 Winter break	VfR Mannheim II	0–8	Basel	Mannheim
		Summary	(1:0) Wenger (2:0) Albicker II (3:0) (4:0) (5:0) (6:0) (7:0) (8:0)

25 December 1912 Winter break	ETB Schwarz-Weiss Essen	2–1	Basel	Essen
	Goal	Summary	Goal

26 December 1912 Winter break	Düsseldorfer FC Fortuna 1911	2–4	Basel	Düsseldorf
	Goal	Summary	Goal
Note: The game was stopped after 85 minutes because of spectator incidents

5 January 1913 Winter break	St. Gallen	2–2	Basel	St. Gallen
	Goal	Summary	Goal

23 February 1913 Mid-season	Zürich	7–1	Basel	Zürich
	Goal	Summary	Goal

16 March 1913 Mid-season	Basel	4–3	Concordia Basel	Landhof, Basel
10:00	Goal	Summary	Goal

23 March 1913 Mid-season	SC Erfurt	2–1	Basel	Erfurt
	Goal	Summary	Goal

24 March 1913 Mid-season	BC Sportlust Dresden	1–2	Basel	Dresden
	Goal	Summary	Goal

25 March 1913 Mid-season	SC Wacker Leipzig	3–3	Basel	Leipzig
	Goal	Summary	Goal

13 April 1913 Mid-season	FC Stella Fribourg	0–5	Basel	Freiburg im Breisgau
		Summary	Goal

27 April 1913 End of season	St. Gallen	1–3	Basel	St. Gallen
	Goal	Summary	Goal

10 May 1913 End of season	Basel	0–11	Preston North End	Landhof, Basel
		Summary	Goal

1 June 1913 End of season	Basel	7–2	Freiburger FC	Landhof, Basel
10:30	(1:0) (2:0) (3:0) (4:0) (5:0) (6:1) (7:2)	Summary	(5:1) (6:2)
Note: Freiburger FC played with 10 men

8 June 1913 End of season	St. Gallen	1–4	Basel	St. Gallen
	Goal	Summary	Goal

=== Serie A ===
==== Central group results ====
13 October 1912 Round 1	Basel	1–3	Nordstern Basel	Landhof, Basel
	Kaltenbach (1:0)	Summary	(1:1) (1:2) (1:3)	Referee: (Switzerland) von Grafenried FC Bern

20 October 1912 Round 2	La Chaux-de-Fonds	4–2	Basel	La Chaux-de-Fonds
	(1:0) (2:0) (3:0) (4:0)	Summary	(4:1) (4:2)	Referee: (Switzerland) Ammann Cantonal Neuchâtel

27 October 1912 Round 3	Basel	2–2	Old Boys	Landhof, Basel
15:00	Wunderle (1:2); Schreyer (2:2)	Summary	(0:1) Merkt (pen. 0:2)	Referee: (Switzerland) Steiger FC Bern

17 November 1912 Round 4	FC Bern	2–1	Basel	Kirchenfeld, Bern
15:05	Niquille 42' (1:0); Keller 55' (2:1)	Summary	50' (1:1) Kaltenbach	Referee: (Switzerland) Gassmann Biel-Bienne

24 November 1912 Round 5	Basel	6–0	Étoile-Sporting	Landhof, Basel
15:00	Albicker (I) (1:0); Albicker (I) (2:0); Wenger (3:0); Albicker (I) (4:0); Albicker (I) (5:0); Wenger (6:0)	Summary		Referee: (Switzerland) Steiger FC Bern

1 December 1912 Round 6	Young Boys	2–3	Basel	Bern
	Adamina (1:1); Bertschi (2:1)	Summary	20' (0:1) Schreyer (2:2) (2:3)

15 December 1912 Round 7	Biel-Bienne	3–2	Basel	Biel-Bienne
14:40	Siegrist 46' (1:2); Siegrist 48' (2:2); Siegrist (pen. 3:2)	Summary	(0:1) (0:2) Kaltenbach	Referee: (Switzerland) Steiger FC Bern

12 January 1913 Round 8	Basel	6–1	Young Boys	Landhof, Basel
	Albicker (I) (1:0) (2:1) (3:1) (4:1) (5:1) (6:1)	Summary	(1:1)	Attendance: 1,000

19 January 1913 Round 9	Nordstern Basel	1–5	Basel	Staldenrain, Riehen
15:15	Hermann (1:3)	Summary	(0:1) Albicker (I) (0:2) Schreyer (0:3) Wenger (1:4) Schreyer; 80' (1:5) Albicker (I)	Attendance: 1,200; Referee: (Switzerland) Huldi Zürich

2 February 1913 Round 10	Old Boys	8–3	Basel	Margarethenwiese, Basel
15:10	8' (1:0); Kalt 18' (2:0); 41' (3:0); 45' (4:1); Lüscher (5:3) (6:3) (7:3); Kalt (8:3)	Summary	41' (3:1) Albicker (I) (4:2) Schreyer (4:3) Albicker (I)	Referee: (Switzerland) Reich Winterthur

9 February 1913 Round 11	Basel	2–0	La Chaux-de-Fonds	Landhof, Basel
15:15	Albicker (I) (1:0); Schreyer (2:0)	Summary

30 March 1913 Round 12	Basel	9–2	Biel-Bienne	Landhof, Basel
	(1:0) (2:0) (3:0) (4:0) (5:2) (6:2) (7:2) (8:2) (9:2)	Summary	(4:1) (4:2)	Referee: (Switzerland) Adamir Sandoz La Chaux-de-Fonds

6 April 1913 Round 13	Basel	2–2	FC Bern	Landhof, Basel
	Wunderle 21' (1:1); Bredschneider (2:2)	Summary	6' (0:1) Beyeler II (1:2) Beyeler I	Attendance: 1,500; Referee: (Switzerland) Dondelinger (FC Breite)

20 April 1913 Round 14	Étoile-Sporting	0–2	Basel	Parc de l'Etoile La Chaux-de-Fonds
		Summary	(0:1) (0:2)

==== Central group league table ====
Pos	Team	Pld	W	D	L	GF	GA	GD	Pts	Qualification
1	Old Boys	14	9	2	3	43	29	+14	20	Advance to finals
2	Young Boys	14	9	1	4	41	25	+16	19	
3	Étoile-Sporting	14	8	1	5	33	25	+8	17	
4	Basel	14	7	2	5	46	30	+16	16	
5	FC Bern	14	6	2	6	43	38	+5	14	
6	Nordstern Basel	14	5	2	7	35	46	−11	12	
7	La Chaux-de-Fonds	14	3	3	8	38	50	−12	9	
8	Biel-Bienne	14	2	1	11	29	65	−36	5	To relegation play-off

Source: rsssf

=== Anglo-Cup ===
1 May 1913 Round of 32	Basel	5–0	Solothurn	Landhof, Basel
15:30	Goal	Summary		Attendance: 400

8 June 1913 Round of 16	Basel	4–1	St. Gallen	Landhof, Basel
10:30	Schreyer (1:0); Albicker (I) (2:0); Schreyer (3:0); Schreyer (4:1)	Summary	(3:1)	Referee: (Switzerland) Dondelinger (FC Breite)

15 June 1913 Quarterfinal	Basel	3–0 FF	Zürich	Landhof, Basel
		Summary

22 June 1913 Semifinal	Basel	3–0	Winterthur	Landhof, Basel
	Goal	Summary		Referee: (Switzerland)

29 June 1913 Final	FC Weissenbühl Bern	0–5	Basel	Hardau, Zürich
		Summary	Goal

== See also ==
- History of FC Basel
- List of FC Basel players
- List of FC Basel seasons

== Sources ==
- Rotblau: Jahrbuch Saison 2014/2015. Publisher: FC Basel Marketing AG. ISBN 978-3-7245-2027-6
- Die ersten 125 Jahre. Publisher: Josef Zindel im Friedrich Reinhardt Verlag, Basel. ISBN 978-3-7245-2305-5
- FCB team 1912–13 at fcb-archiv.ch
- Switzerland 1912-13 at RSSSF
