= Rittel =

Rittel is a German language habitational surname for someone who lived at a clearing. Notable people with the name include:

- Anton Rittel, Swiss footballer
- Ernst Rittel, Swiss footballer
- Horst Rittel (1930–1990)), German design theorist and university professor
