= Birger Persson (footballer) =

Swedish footballer

Personal information
- Full name: Birger Persson
- Date of birth: 1892
- Position: Striker

Senior career*
Years	Team	Apps	(Gls)
1910–1912	FC Basel	1 (Note: The player lines-ups and goal scorers for 10 of the 14 league games in the 1910–11 season are unknown or incomplete.) (Note: The player lines-ups and goal scorers for 6 of the 14 league games in the 1911–12 season are unknown or incomplete.)	(0)
- * Club domestic league appearances and goals

Birger Persson (born in 1892) was a Swedish footballer who played for FC Basel as a forward.

== Football career ==
Persson joined Basel's first team for their 1910–11 FC season. He played his first game for the club in the friendly away match in the Schützenwiese on 4 September 1910 as Basel won 2–0 against Winterthur. He scored his first goal for his club in the friendly match on 5 March 1911 in Mannheim, Germany. But it could not save the team as Basel were defeated 1–6 by Mannheimer FG 1896.

After playing in eight friendly matches, Persson played his domestic league debut for the club in the away game in the Landhof on 21 January 1912 as Basel were defeated 1–2 by local rivals Nordstern Basel.

Persson played two seasons for Basel's first team. In the 1912–13 season he played for the club's reserve team, who at that time played in the Serie C, the third tear of Swiss football.

== Notes ==
=== Footnotes ===
1910–11 season matches: Aarau-FCB, FCB-YB, Stella-FCB, FCB-Biel, FCB-Aarau, YB-FCB, FCB-Stella, OB-FCB, Bern-FCB and Biel-FCB
1911–12 season matches: FCB-Nordstern, LcdF-FCB, Sporting-FCB, Biel-FCB, FCB-Biel, YB-FCB

=== Sources ===
- Rotblau: Jahrbuch Saison 2017/2018. Publisher: FC Basel Marketing AG. ISBN 978-3-7245-2189-1
- Die ersten 125 Jahre. Publisher: Josef Zindel im Friedrich Reinhardt Verlag, Basel. ISBN 978-3-7245-2305-5
- Profile: Birger Persson at Verein "Basler Fussballarchiv"
