= Eduard Bauer =

Eduard Bauer may refer to:

- Edi Bauer (1894–1948), Austrian footballer who played between 1911 and 1926
- Eduard Bauer (footballer), Swiss footballer who played between 1908 and 1914
