= Albicker =

Albicker is a surname. Notable people with the surname include:

- Christian Albicker (1892–1934), Swiss footballer
- Fritz Albicker (1893–1959), Swiss footballer
