= Werner Keller =

Werner Keller may refer to:

- Werner Keller (footballer) fl. 1908, Swiss footballer
- Werner Keller (writer) (1909–1980), German writer and literary scientist
- Werner Keller (politician) (born 1959), Canadian politician
