= 1909–10 Swiss Serie A =

Swiss football season

Swiss Serie A
- Season: 1909–10

Statistics of Swiss Super League in the 1909–10 season.

== East ==
=== Table ===
Pos	Team	Pld	W	D	L	GF	GA	GD	Pts
1	FC Aarau	11	9	2	0	40	7	+33	20
2	FC Winterthur	11	7	2	2	26	14	+12	16
3	FC Zürich	11	6	2	3	32	23	+9	14
4	FC St. Gallen	11	5	0	6	18	21	−3	10
5	Young Fellows Zürich	11	4	0	7	30	30	0	8
6	FC Baden	11	2	0	9	18	43	−25	4
7	Grasshopper Club Zürich	6	0	0	6	2	28	−26	0

Source: rsssf

Aarau qualified.

== Central ==
=== Table ===
Pos	Team	Pld	W	D	L	GF	GA	GD	Pts
1	Young Boys Bern	10	6	1	3	38	18	+20	13
2	Old Boys Basel	10	4	3	3	26	23	+3	11
3	FC Bern	10	4	3	3	22	20	+2	11
4	FC Biel	10	4	2	4	27	23	+4	10
5	FC Basel	10	4	2	4	24	24	0	10
6	FC Lucerne	10	2	1	7	15	44	−29	5

Source: rsssf

Young Boys qualified.

== West ==
=== Table ===
Pos	Team	Pld	W	D	L	GF	GA	GD	Pts
1	Servette Genf	10	8	1	1	45	12	+33	17
2	Stella Fribourg	10	3	3	4	36	35	+1	9
3	FC La Chaux-de-Fonds	10	3	3	4	30	34	−4	9
4	Etoile La Chaux-de-Fonds	10	3	3	4	29	39	−10	9
5	Montriond Lausanne	10	3	3	4	20	33	−13	9
6	Cantonal Neuchatel	10	3	1	6	23	30	−7	7

Source: rsssf

Servette qualified.

== Final ==
=== Table ===
Pos	Team	Pld	W	D	L	GF	GA	GD	Pts
1	Young Boys Bern	2	2	0	0	5	2	+3	4
2	Servette Genf	2	1	0	1	4	3	+1	2
3	FC Aarau	2	0	0	2	2	6	−4	0

Source: rsssf

=== Results ===
Team 1	Score	Team 2
5 June 1910
Servette	3–1	Aarau
12 June 1910
Young Boys	3–1	Aarau
26 June 1910
Young Boys	2–1	Servette

Young Boys Bern won the championship.

== Sources ==
- Switzerland 1909-10 at RSSSF
