= Paul Gürtler =

Swiss footballer (born 1891)

Personal information
- Full name: Paul Gürtler
- Date of birth: 16 July 1891
- Positions: Midfielder; striker

Senior career*
Years	Team	Apps	(Gls)
1909–1910	FC Basel	5+	(0)
- * Club domestic league appearances and goals

Paul Gürtler (16 July 1891) was a Swiss footballer who played for FC Basel as midfielder or striker in the early 1900s.

== Football career ==
Gürtler joined FC Basel's first team for their 1909–10 season. He played his domestic league debut for the club as striker in the home game in the Landhof on 17 October 1909 as Basel won 7–0 against Luzern.

He played for the club for this one season, mainly as midfielder, and during this time Gürtler played at least 17 games for Basel scoring five goals. He scored five goals during the friendly games. His first goal was on 5 December 1909 in the away game against La Chaux-de-Fonds as Basel won 6–3. Five of these games were in the Nationalliga A, two in the Anglo Cup and ten were friendly games. He probably played more games but the documentation is not available. (Note: The player lines-ups and goal scorers for 6 of the 10 league games in the 1909–10 season are unknown or incomplete.)

== Notes ==
=== Footnote ===
Incomplete league matches 1909–1910 season: YB-FCB, FCB-Biel, Luzern-FCB, Bern-FCB, FCB-YB, Biel-FCB

=== Sources ===
- Rotblau: Jahrbuch Saison 2017/2018. Publisher: FC Basel Marketing AG. ISBN 978-3-7245-2189-1
- Die ersten 125 Jahre. Publisher: Josef Zindel im Friedrich Reinhardt Verlag, Basel. ISBN 978-3-7245-2305-5
- Verein "Basler Fussballarchiv" Homepage

(NB: Despite all efforts, the editors of these books and the authors in "Basler Fussballarchiv" have failed to be able to identify all the players, their date and place of birth or date and place of death, who played in the games during the early years of FC Basel)
