= Ernst Amstein =

Swiss footballer (born 1889)

Personal information
- Full name: Ernst Amstein
- Date of birth: 22 July 1889
- Place of birth: Switzerland
- Position: Defender

Senior career*
Years	Team	Apps	(Gls)
1908–1910	FC Basel	6+	(0)
- * Club domestic league appearances and goals

Ernst Amstein (born 22 July 1889) was a Swiss footballer who played for FC Basel in the early 1900s as defender.

== Football career ==
Amstein joined Basel's first team for their 1908–09 season from their reserve team. After playing in three test games, Amstein played his domestic league debut for the club in the away game on 2 May 1909 as Basel won 5–2 against Aarau. According to the existing documents, Amstein played one domestic league game in this season. (Note: The player lines-ups and goal scorers for 10 of the 14 league games in the 1908–09 season are unknown or incomplete.)

Amstein stayed with the first team for another season. In their 1909–10 season, Amstein is documented in five domestic league matches. (Note: The player lines-ups and goal scorers for 6 of the 10 league games in the 1909–10 season are unknown or incomplete.)

Between the years 1908 and 1910 Amstein played at least 21 games for Basel without scoring a goal. At least six of these games were in the Nationalliga A, one in the Anglo Cup and 14 were friendly games.

== Notes ==
=== Footnotes ===
Incomplete league matches 1908–1909 season: FCB-YF, FCZ-FCB, FCB-Aarau, FCW-FCB, FCB-FCSG, YF-FCB, FCB-FCB, FCB-OB, GC-FCB, FCSG-FCB

Incomplete league matches 1909–1910 season: YB-FCB, FCB-Biel, Luzern-FCB, Bern-FCB, FCB-YB, Biel-FCB

=== Sources ===
- Rotblau: Jahrbuch Saison 2017/2018. Publisher: FC Basel Marketing AG. ISBN 978-3-7245-2189-1
- Die ersten 125 Jahre. Publisher: Josef Zindel im Friedrich Reinhardt Verlag, Basel. ISBN 978-3-7245-2305-5
- Verein "Basler Fussballarchiv" Homepage

(NB: Despite all efforts, the editors of these books and the authors in "Basler Fussballarchiv" have failed to be able to identify all the players, their date and place of birth or date and place of death, who played in the games during the early years of FC Basel)
