= Luigi Persenico =

Swiss footballer (born 1889)

Personal information
- Full name: Luigi Persenico
- Date of birth: 28 July 1889
- Place of birth: Switzerland
- Position: Midfielder

Senior career*
| Years | Team | Apps | (Gls) |
| 1906–1910 | FC Basel | 5 | (0) |
- * Club domestic league appearances and goals

Luigi Persenico (born 28 July 1889) was a Swiss footballer who played for FC Basel in the early 1900s as midfielder.

Persenco played for the first time in Basel's first team on 19 May 1907. It was a friendly match against a combined team from the medical recruit school. To make things fairer, the football team played in a completely different line-up as usual, all defenders played as forwards and vice versa. The Football team won 3–0 against the medical recruits.

Actually Persenco played for the Basel reserve team and after this friendly he returned to them. He joined Basel's first team during their 1909–10 season. After playing in two test games Persenco played his domestic league debut for the club in the home game in the Landhof on 17 October 1909 as Basel won 7–0 against Luzern.

During his time in Basel's first team Persenco played a total of 17 games without scoring a goal. Five of these games were in the Swiss Serie A, two in the Anglo-Cup and ten were friendly games.

== Sources ==
- Rotblau: Jahrbuch Saison 2017/2018. Publisher: FC Basel Marketing AG. ISBN 978-3-7245-2189-1
- Die ersten 125 Jahre. Publisher: Josef Zindel im Friedrich Reinhardt Verlag, Basel. ISBN 978-3-7245-2305-5
- Verein "Basler Fussballarchiv" Homepage

(NB: Despite all efforts, the editors of these books and the authors in "Basler Fussballarchiv" have failed to be able to identify all the players, their date and place of birth or date and place of death, who played in the games during the early years of FC Basel)
