= 1905–06 Swiss Serie A =

Swiss football season

Swiss Serie A
- Season: 1905–06

Statistics of Swiss Super League in the 1905–06 season.

== East ==
=== Group 1 ===
Pos	Team	Pld	W	D	L	GF	GA	GD	Pts
1	FC Zürich	6	4	2	0	15	4	+11	10
2	Grasshopper Club Zürich	6	2	1	3	10	12	−2	5
3	Young Fellows Zürich	6	2	1	3	10	15	−5	5
4	Kickers Zürich	6	1	2	3	11	15	−4	4

Source: rsssf

=== Group 2 ===
Pos	Team	Pld	W	D	L	GF	GA	GD	Pts
1	FC Winterthur	4	3	1	0	15	6	+9	7
2	FC St. Gallen	4	2	1	1	12	9	+3	5
3	Blue Stars St. Gallen	4	0	0	4	1	13	−12	0

Source: rsssf

=== East final ===
Team 1	Score	Team 2
Zürich	0–5	Winterthur

== Central ==
Pos	Team	Pld	W	D	L	GF	GA	GD	Pts
1	Young Boys Bern	6	3	3	0	20	12	+8	9
2	FC Bern	6	3	1	2	13	12	+1	7
3	Old Boys Basel	6	1	2	3	8	11	−3	4
4	FC Basel	6	2	0	4	11	17	−6	4

Source: rsssf

== West ==
Pos	Team	Pld	W	D	L	GF	GA	GD	Pts
1	Servette Genf	6	4	2	0	17	5	+12	10
2	Lausanne Sports	6	3	2	1	16	7	+9	8
3	FC La Chaux-de-Fonds	6	3	0	3	15	9	+6	6
4	FC Genf	6	0	0	6	5	32	−27	0

Source: rsssf

== Final ==
=== Table ===
Pos	Team	Pld	W	D	L	GF	GA	GD	Pts
1	FC Winterthur	2	2	0	0	9	4	+5	4
2	Servette Genf	2	1	0	1	6	5	+1	2
3	Young Boys Bern	2	0	0	2	3	9	−6	0

Source: rsssf

=== Results ===
Team 1	Score	Team 2
22 April 1906
Winterthur	4–2	Servette
7 May 1906
Servette	4–1	Young Boys
14 May 1906
Winterthur	5–2	Young Boys

FC Winterthur won the championship.

== Sources ==
- Switzerland 1905-06 at RSSSF
