= H. Légeret =

Swiss footballer

Personal information
- Full name: H. Légeret
- Positions: Midfielder; striker

Senior career*
Years	Team	Apps	(Gls)
1908–1909	FC Basel	2+	(0)
- * Club domestic league appearances and goals

H. Légeret (date of birth unknown) was a footballer who played for FC Basel. He played as striker and as midfielder in the 1910s.

== Football career ==
Légeret joined Basel's first team for their 1908–09 season. Légeret played his domestic league debut for the club in the home game in the Landhof on 25 October 1908 as Basel were defeated 2–9 by Grasshopper Club.

Légeret scored one goal in the friendly match at home on 14 February 1909, but this could not help the team because they lost the game 1–2 against La Chaux-de-Fonds. He played one season for the Basel and in at least four games for them. (Note: The player lines-ups and goal scorers for 10 of the 14 league games in the 1908–09 season are either unknown or are incomplete.) At least two of these games were in the Swiss Serie A and two were friendly games.

== Notes ==
=== Footnotes ===
Incomplete league matches 1908–1909 season: FCB-YF, FCZ-FCB, FCB-Aarau, FCW-FCB, FCB-FCSG, YF-FCB, FCB-FCB, FCB-OB, GC-FCB, FCSG-FCB

=== Sources ===
- Rotblau: Jahrbuch Saison 2017/2018. Publisher: FC Basel Marketing AG. ISBN 978-3-7245-2189-1
- Die ersten 125 Jahre. Publisher: Josef Zindel im Friedrich Reinhardt Verlag, Basel. ISBN 978-3-7245-2305-5
