= Ernst Bickel (footballer) =

Swiss footballer

Personal information
- Full name: Ernst Bickel
- Date of birth: unknown
- Positions: Midfielder; striker

Senior career*
Years	Team	Apps	(Gls)
1914–1916	FC Basel	4	(0)
- * Club domestic league appearances and goals

Ernst Bickel (date of birth unknown) was a Swiss footballer who played for FC Basel in the 1910s. He played either as forward or as midfielder.

Bickel joined Basel's first team for their 1914–15 season. World War I had just started and the start to the 1914–15 Swiss Serie A season was delayed until December. Bickel played his domestic league debut for the club in the first game of the season, an away game on 6 December 1914 as Basel were defeated 1–5 by Aarau.

Bickel played with the club for two seasons and during this time he played a total of five games for Basel without scoring a goal. Four of these games were in the Serie A and the other was a friendly game.

== Sources ==
- Rotblau: Jahrbuch Saison 2017/2018. Publisher: FC Basel Marketing AG. ISBN 978-3-7245-2189-1
- Die ersten 125 Jahre. Publisher: Josef Zindel im Friedrich Reinhardt Verlag, Basel. ISBN 978-3-7245-2305-5
- Verein "Basler Fussballarchiv" Homepage

(NB: Despite all efforts, the editors of these books and the authors in "Basler Fussballarchiv" have failed to be able to identify all the players, their date and place of birth or date and place of death, who played in the games during the early years of FC Basel)
