= 1912–13 Swiss Serie A =

Swiss football season

Swiss Serie A
- Season: 1912–13

Statistics of Swiss Super League in the 1912–13 season.

== East ==
=== Table ===
Pos	Team	Pld	W	D	L	GF	GA	GD	Pts
1	FC Aarau	14	12	1	1	50	18	+32	25
2	FC St. Gallen	14	8	3	3	67	21	+46	19
3	FC Zürich	14	8	2	4	45	24	+21	18
4	Brühl St. Gallen	14	7	3	4	42	35	+7	17
5	FC Winterthur	14	4	2	8	34	28	+6	10
6	Young Fellows Zürich	14	4	2	8	22	45	−23	10
7	FC Baden	14	3	2	9	17	49	−32	8
8	FC Lucerne	14	2	1	11	13	70	−57	5

Source: rsssf

== Central ==
=== Table ===
Pos	Team	Pld	W	D	L	GF	GA	GD	Pts
1	Old Boys Basel	14	9	2	3	43	29	+14	20
2	Young Boys Bern	14	9	1	4	41	25	+16	19
3	Etoile La Chaux-de-Fonds	14	8	1	5	33	25	+8	17
4	FC Basel	14	7	2	5	46	30	+16	16
5	FC Bern	14	6	2	6	43	38	+5	14
6	Nordstern Basel	14	5	2	7	35	46	−11	12
7	FC La Chaux-de-Fonds	14	3	3	8	38	50	−12	9
8	FC Biel	14	2	1	11	29	65	−36	5

Source: rsssf

== West ==
=== Table ===
Pos	Team	Pld	W	D	L	GF	GA	GD	Pts
1	Montriond Lausanne	12	7	4	1	34	12	+22	18
2	Servette Genf	12	7	2	3	25	18	+7	16
3	Stella Fribourg	12	7	1	4	30	21	+9	15
4	Cantonal Neuchatel	12	5	2	5	31	23	+8	12
5	Concordia Yverdon	12	4	3	5	26	27	−1	11
6	Montreux Narcisse	12	3	1	8	13	32	−19	7
7	FC Genf	12	2	1	9	13	39	−26	5

Source: rsssf

== Final ==
=== Table ===
Pos	Team	Pld	W	D	L	GF	GA	GD	Pts
1	Lausanne Sports	2	2	0	0	3	1	+2	4
2	Old Boys Basel	2	1	0	1	2	2	0	2
3	FC Aarau	2	0	0	2	2	4	−2	0

Source: rsssf

=== Results ===
Team 1	Score	Team 2
25 May 1913
Old Boys	2–1	Aarau
8 June 1913
Lausanne-Sports	2–1	Aarau
15 June 1913
Lausanne-Sports	1–0	Old Boys

Lausanne Sports won the championship.

== Sources ==
- Switzerland 1912-13 at RSSSF
