= Jules Lotter =

Swiss footballer

Personal information
- Full name: Jules Lotter
- Date of birth: unknown
- Position: Midfielder

Senior career*
Years	Team	Apps	(Gls)
1916–1918	FC Basel	2	(1)
- * Club domestic league appearances and goals

Jules Lotter (date of birth unknown) was a Swiss footballer who played for FC Basel as midfielder.

Lotter joined Basel's first team for their 1916–17 season. He played his domestic league debut for the club in the away game in the Gurzelen Stadion on 8 October 1916 as Basel played against Biel-Bienne. He scored his first goal for his club in the same game, but it could not help save the team from a 3–4 defeat.

He played with the team for two seasons and during this time Lotter played a total of six games for Basel scoring that one goal. Two of these games were in the Serie A and four were friendly games.

== Sources ==
- Rotblau: Jahrbuch Saison 2017/2018. Publisher: FC Basel Marketing AG. ISBN 978-3-7245-2189-1
- Die ersten 125 Jahre. Publisher: Josef Zindel im Friedrich Reinhardt Verlag, Basel. ISBN 978-3-7245-2305-5
- Verein "Basler Fussballarchiv" Homepage

(NB: Despite all efforts, the editors of these books and the authors in "Basler Fussballarchiv" have failed to be able to identify all the players, their date and place of birth or date and place of death, who played in the games during the early years of FC Basel)
