= 1910–11 Swiss Serie A =

Swiss football season

Swiss Serie A
- Season: 1910–11

Statistics of Swiss Super League in the 1910–11 season.

== East ==
=== Table ===
Pos	Team	Pld	W	D	L	GF	GA	GD	Pts
1	FC Zürich	12	9	3	0	49	22	+27	21
2	FC Winterthur	12	9	3	0	41	8	+33	21
3	FC St. Gallen	12	7	0	5	46	22	+24	14
4	Brühl St. Gallen	12	5	2	5	31	30	+1	12
5	Young Fellows Zürich	12	5	0	7	25	35	−10	10
6	FC Baden	12	2	0	10	10	39	−29	4
7	FC Lucerne	12	1	0	11	6	52	−46	2

Source: rsssf

== Central ==
=== Table ===
Pos	Team	Pld	W	D	L	GF	GA	GD	Pts
1	Young Boys Bern	12	10	2	0	45	10	+35	22
2	FC Aarau	12	10	0	2	52	16	+36	20
3	FC Basel	12	5	1	6	32	36	−4	11
4	FC Biel	12	4	3	5	28	39	−11	11
5	FC Bern	12	4	1	7	22	29	−7	9
6	Old Boys Basel	12	2	3	7	27	42	−15	7
7	Stella Fribourg	12	2	0	10	17	51	−34	4

Source: rsssf

== West ==
=== Table ===
Pos	Team	Pld	W	D	L	GF	GA	GD	Pts
1	Servette Genf	12	8	3	1	58	18	+40	19
2	Cantonal Neuchatel	12	8	3	1	54	26	+28	19
3	Lausanne Sports	12	5	4	3	34	35	−1	14
4	FC La Chaux-de-Fonds	12	5	3	4	34	30	+4	13
5	Etoile La Chaux-de-Fonds	12	5	1	6	30	33	−3	11
6	Montreux Narcisse	12	2	0	10	23	53	−30	4
7	FC Genf	12	1	2	9	19	57	−38	4

Source: rsssf

== Final ==
=== Table ===
Pos	Team	Pld	W	D	L	GF	GA	GD	Pts
1	Young Boys Bern	2	2	0	0	5	1	+4	4
2	FC Zürich	2	1	0	1	2	2	0	2
3	Servette Genf	2	0	0	2	2	6	−4	0

Source: rsssf

=== Results ===
Team 1	Score	Team 2
14 May 1911
Zürich	2–1	Servette
28 May 1911
Young Boys	4–1	Servette
11 June 1911
Young Boys	1–1	Zürich

Young Boys Bern won the championship.

== Sources ==
- Switzerland 1910-11 at RSSSF
