= Werner Keller (footballer) =

Swiss footballer

Personal information
- Full name: Werner Keller
- Date of birth: unknown
- Place of birth: Switzerland
- Position: Striker

Senior career*
Years	Team	Apps	(Gls)
1908–1909	FC Basel	5+	(3)
- * Club domestic league appearances and goals

Werner Keller (date of birth unknown) was a Swiss footballer who played as forward in the early 1900s.

== Football career ==
Keller joined FC Basel's first team for their 1908–09 season. He played his domestic league debut for the club in the home game in the Landhof on 11 October 1908 as Basel were defeated 1–2 by Young Fellows Zürich. He scored his first goal for his club on 28 February 1909. He scored a hat-trick in the home game as Basel won 4–3 against Zürich.

During his one season with the club, Keller played at least eight games for Basel scoring four goals. Five of these games were in the Swiss Serie A and three were friendly games. He scored that hat-trick in the domestic league and the others was during the test games. He probably played more games but the documentation is not available. (Note: The player lines-ups and goal scorers for 10 of the 14 league games in the 1908–09 season are unknown or incomplete.)

== Notes ==
=== Footnotes ===
Incomplete 1908–09 season league matches: FCB-YF, FCZ-FCB, FCB-Aarau, FCW-FCB, FCB-FCSG, YF-FCB, FCB-FCB, FCB-OB, GC-FCB, FCSG-FCB

=== Sources ===
- Rotblau: Jahrbuch Saison 2017/2018. Publisher: FC Basel Marketing AG. ISBN 978-3-7245-2189-1
- Die ersten 125 Jahre. Publisher: Josef Zindel im Friedrich Reinhardt Verlag, Basel. ISBN 978-3-7245-2305-5
- Verein "Basler Fussballarchiv" Homepage

(NB: Despite all efforts, the editors of these books and the authors in "Basler Fussballarchiv" have failed to be able to identify all the players, their date and place of birth or date and place of death, who played in the games during the early years of FC Basel. The full documentation is not available.)
