= Ernst Rittel =

Swiss footballer

Personal information
- Full name: Ernst Rittel
- Date of birth: unknown
- Place of birth: Switzerland
- Positions: Midfielder; striker

Senior career*
Years	Team	Apps	(Gls)
1915–1918	FC Basel	5	(0)
- * Club domestic league appearances and goals

Ernst Rittel, also known as Rittel (II) (date of birth unknown) was a Swiss footballer who played for FC Basel. He played mainly as forward, but also as midfielder.

Rittel joined FC Basel's first team for their 1915–16 season under player-coach and captain Ernst Kaltenbach. Rittel played his domestic league debut for the club in the away game on 3 October 1915 as Basel were defeated 1–3 by Étoile-Sporting.

Between the years 1915 and 1918 Rittel (II) played a total of 12 games for Basel without scoring a goal. Five of these games were in the Nationalliga A and seven were friendly games.

== Sources ==
- Rotblau: Jahrbuch Saison 2017/2018. Publisher: FC Basel Marketing AG. ISBN 978-3-7245-2189-1
- Die ersten 125 Jahre. Publisher: Josef Zindel im Friedrich Reinhardt Verlag, Basel. ISBN 978-3-7245-2305-5
- Verein "Basler Fussballarchiv" Homepage

(NB: Despite all efforts, the editors of these books and the authors in "Basler Fussballarchiv" have failed to be able to identify all the players, their date and place of birth or date and place of death, who played in the games during the early years of FC Basel)
