= Emil Schreyer =

Swiss footballer

Personal information
- Full name: Emil Schreyer
- Place of birth: Switzerland
- Date of death: 6 August 1916
- Positions: Midfielder; forward

Senior career*
Years	Team	Apps	(Gls)
1912–1915	FC Basel	28	(11)
- * Club domestic league appearances and goals

Emil Schreyer (died 6 August 1916) was a Swiss footballer who played for FC Basel. He played mainly in the position of forward, but also as a midfielder.

Between the years 1912 and 1915 Schreyer played 42 games for Basel scoring 11 goals; 28 of these games were in the Swiss Serie A, two in the Anglo-Cup and 12 were friendly games. He scored 11 goal in the domestic league and three in the Anglo-Cup, the other three were scored during the test games.

In the 1912–13 season Basel won the Anglo-Cup. In the round of 16 on 8 June 1913 Schreyer scored a hattrick as Basel beat St. Gallen 4–1 to continue to the next round. He was part of the team that won the final on 29 June 1913 in the Hardau Stadium, Zürich against FC Weissenbühl Bern 5–0.

== Sources and References ==
- Rotblau: Jahrbuch Saison 2017/2018. Publisher: FC Basel Marketing AG. ISBN 978-3-7245-2189-1
