= 1908–09 Swiss Serie A =

Swiss football season

Swiss Serie A
- Season: 1908–09

Statistics of Swiss Super League in the 1908–09 season.

== East ==
=== Table ===
Pos	Team	Pld	W	D	L	GF	GA	GD	Pts
1	FC Winterthur	14	11	3	0	59	17	+42	25
2	FC St. Gallen	14	8	2	4	53	35	+18	18
3	Old Boys Basel	14	8	2	4	51	44	+7	18
4	FC Aarau	14	7	2	5	48	46	+2	16
5	Young Fellows Zürich	14	5	2	7	46	48	−2	12
6	FC Basel	14	4	3	7	39	57	−18	11
7	FC Zürich	14	4	0	10	38	55	−17	8
8	Grasshopper Club Zürich	14	2	0	12	23	55	−32	4

Source: rsssf

== West ==
=== Table ===
Pos	Team	Pld	W	D	L	GF	GA	GD	Pts
1	Young Boys Bern	12	12	0	0	51	12	+39	24
2	FC La Chaux-de-Fonds	12	8	0	4	35	16	+19	16
3	Cantonal Neuchatel	12	7	0	5	35	22	+13	14
4	Servette Genf	12	6	1	5	35	36	−1	13
5	Vereinigter FC Biel	12	5	0	7	25	28	−3	10
6	Lausanne Sports	12	2	0	10	16	45	−29	4
7	FC Bern	12	1	1	10	13	51	−38	3

Source: rsssf

== Final ==
Team 1	Score	Team 2
6 June 1909
Winterthur	0–1	Young Boys

Young Boys Bern won the championship.

== Sources ==
- Switzerland 1908-09 at RSSSF
