= 1915–16 Swiss Serie A =

Swiss football season

Swiss Serie A
- Season: 1915–16

This article gives statistics of the Swiss Super League in the 1915–16 association football season.

== East ==
=== Table ===
| Pos | Team | Pld | W | D | L | GF | GA | GD | Pts |
|---|---|---|---|---|---|---|---|---|---|
| 1 | FC Winterthur | 12 | 10 | 2 | 0 | 46 | 25 | +21 | 22 |
| 2 | FC St. Gallen | 12 | 7 | 2 | 3 | 44 | 27 | +17 | 16 |
| 3 | FC Zürich | 12 | 7 | 1 | 4 | 28 | 25 | +3 | 15 |
| 4 | FC Aarau | 12 | 5 | 1 | 6 | 26 | 32 | −6 | 11 |
| 5 | Young Fellows Zürich | 12 | 4 | 1 | 7 | 33 | 47 | −14 | 9 |
| 6 | Brühl St. Gallen | 12 | 2 | 2 | 8 | 27 | 33 | −6 | 6 |
| 7 | Blue Stars Zürich | 12 | 2 | 1 | 9 | 25 | 40 | −15 | 5 |

Source: rsssf.com

== Central ==
=== Table ===
| Pos | Team | Pld | W | D | L | GF | GA | GD | Pts |
|---|---|---|---|---|---|---|---|---|---|
| 1 | Old Boys Basel | 14 | 9 | 3 | 2 | 47 | 31 | +16 | 21 |
| 2 | FC Bern | 14 | 9 | 2 | 3 | 41 | 23 | +18 | 20 |
| 3 | Etoile La Chaux-de-Fonds | 14 | 7 | 2 | 5 | 46 | 27 | +19 | 16 |
| 4 | Young Boys Bern | 14 | 6 | 3 | 5 | 33 | 26 | +7 | 15 |
| 5 | FC Biel | 14 | 6 | 2 | 6 | 29 | 26 | +3 | 14 |
| 6 | FC La Chaux-de-Fonds | 14 | 6 | 1 | 7 | 23 | 32 | −9 | 13 |
| 7 | FC Basel | 14 | 4 | 1 | 9 | 30 | 39 | −9 | 9 |
| 8 | Nordstern Basel | 14 | 2 | 0 | 12 | 16 | 61 | −45 | 4 |

Source: rsssf.com

== West ==
=== Table ===
| Pos | Team | Pld | W | D | L | GF | GA | GD | Pts |
|---|---|---|---|---|---|---|---|---|---|
| 1 | Cantonal Neuchâtel | 10 | 8 | 1 | 1 | 41 | 21 | +20 | 17 |
| 2 | Servette Genf | 10 | 6 | 2 | 2 | 34 | 17 | +17 | 14 |
| 3 | Lausanne Sports | 10 | 7 | 0 | 3 | 31 | 21 | +10 | 14 |
| 4 | Stella Fribourg | 10 | 3 | 1 | 6 | 26 | 32 | −6 | 7 |
| 5 | Montreux Narcisse | 10 | 1 | 2 | 7 | 21 | 37 | −16 | 4 |
| 6 | FC Genf | 10 | 1 | 2 | 7 | 13 | 38 | −25 | 4 |

Source: rsssf.com

== Final ==
=== Table ===
| Pos | Team | Pld | W | D | L | GF | GA | GD | Pts |
|---|---|---|---|---|---|---|---|---|---|
| 1 | Cantonal Neuchâtel | 2 | 2 | 0 | 0 | 10 | 4 | +6 | 4 |
| 2 | FC Winterthur | 2 | 0 | 1 | 1 | 3 | 5 | −2 | 1 |
| 3 | Old Boys Basel | 2 | 0 | 1 | 1 | 1 | 5 | −4 | 1 |

Source: rsssf.com

=== Results ===
| Team 1 | Score | Team 2 |
|---|---|---|
16 April 1916
| Cantonal Neuchâtel | 5–3 | Winterthur |
18 June 1916
| Old Boys | 0–0 | Winterthur |
25 June 1916
| Cantonal Neuchâtel | 5–1 | Old Boys |

Cantonal Neuchâtel won the championship.

== Sources ==
- Switzerland 1915-16 at RSSSF
