= Carl Schloz =

Swiss footballer

Personal information
- Full name: Carl Schloz
- Place of birth: Switzerland
- Position: Forward

Senior career*
Years	Team	Apps	(Gls)
1913–1920	FC Basel	30	(1)
- * Club domestic league appearances and goals

Carl Schloz was a Swiss footballer who played for FC Basel. He played mainly in the position as forward.

== Football career ==
Between the years 1913 and 1920 Schloz played a total of 45 games for Basel scoring a total of four goals. 30 of these games were in the Swiss Serie A and 15 were friendly games. He scored one goal in the domestic league, this was on 30 September 1917 as Basel won 3–1 in the home game at the Landhof against Biel-Bienne. The other three goals were scored during the test games.

== Sources ==
- Rotblau: Jahrbuch Saison 2017/2018. Publisher: FC Basel Marketing AG. ISBN 978-3-7245-2189-1
- Die ersten 125 Jahre. Publisher: Josef Zindel im Friedrich Reinhardt Verlag, Basel. ISBN 978-3-7245-2305-5
- Verein "Basler Fussballarchiv" Homepage
