= Emil Ganter =

Swiss footballer

Personal information
- Full name: Emil Ganter
- Place of birth: Switzerland
- Positions: Defender; midfielder

Senior career*
Years	Team	Apps	(Gls)
1916–1919	FC Basel	19	(4)
- * Club domestic league appearances and goals

Emil Ganter was a Swiss footballer who played for FC Basel. He played mainly in the position as defender, but also as midfielder.

== Football career ==
Between the years 1916 and 1919 Ganter played a total of 28 games for Basel scoring a total of four goals. 19 of these games were in the Swiss Serie A and the other nine were friendly games. He scored all his four goals in the domestic league.

== Sources ==
- Rotblau: Jahrbuch Saison 2017/2018. Publisher: FC Basel Marketing AG. ISBN 978-3-7245-2189-1
- Die ersten 125 Jahre. Publisher: Josef Zindel im Friedrich Reinhardt Verlag, Basel. ISBN 978-3-7245-2305-5
- Verein "Basler Fussballarchiv" Homepage
