= Valentin von der Mühll =

Swiss footballer (1884-1929)

Personal information
- Full name: Valentin von der Mühll
- Date of birth: 1884
- Date of death: 1929 (aged 44–45)
- Positions: Midfielder; forward

Senior career*
Years	Team	Apps	(Gls)
1916–1918	FC Basel	4	(1)
- * Club domestic league appearances and goals

Valentin von der Mühll (1884–1929) was a footballer who played two seasons for FC Basel. He played mainly as a forward, but also as a midfielder.

== Football career ==
Between 1916 and 1918 von der Mühll played at least five games for Basel, scoring once. Four of these games were in the Swiss Serie A and the other was a friendly game. He scored his only recorded goal in the domestic league on 3 March 1918 as Basel won 8–3 in the home game at the Landhof against FC Bern.

== Sources ==
- Rotblau: Jahrbuch Saison 2017/2018. Publisher: FC Basel Marketing AG. ISBN 978-3-7245-2189-1
- Die ersten 125 Jahre. Publisher: Josef Zindel im Friedrich Reinhardt Verlag, Basel. ISBN 978-3-7245-2305-5
- Verein "Basler Fussballarchiv" Homepage
