= 1914–15 Swiss Serie A =

Swiss football season

Swiss Serie A
- Season: 1914–15

Statistics of Swiss Super League in the 1914–15 season.

== East ==
Pos	Team	Pld	W	D	L	GF	GA	GD	Pts
1	Brühl St. Gallen	6	4	1	1	11	4	+7	9
2	FC St. Gallen	6	4	1	1	25	2	+23	9
3	FC Winterthur	6	3	0	3	16	10	+6	6
4	Grasshopper Club Zürich	6	0	0	6	7	43	−36	0

Source: rsssf.com

== Central A ==
Pos	Team	Pld	W	D	L	GF	GA	GD	Pts
1	FC Aarau	6	5	0	1	18	7	+11	10
2	Old Boys Basel	6	4	0	2	15	16	−1	8
3	FC Basel	6	2	1	3	15	14	+1	5
4	Nordstern Basel	6	0	1	5	8	19	−11	1

Source: rsssf.com

== Central B ==
Pos	Team	Pld	W	D	L	GF	GA	GD	Pts
1	Young Boys Bern	6	5	1	0	20	3	+17	11
2	Etoile La Chaux-de-Fonds	6	3	1	2	18	9	+9	7
3	FC Bern	6	2	2	2	11	10	+1	6
4	FC Biel	6	0	0	6	5	32	−27	0

Source: rsssf.com

== West ==
Pos	Team	Pld	W	D	L	GF	GA	GD	Pts
1	Servette Genf	6	5	0	1	29	10	+19	10
2	Lausanne Sports	6	4	0	2	23	11	+12	8
3	Cantonal Neuchatel	6	2	0	4	16	23	−7	4
4	Concordia Yverdon	6	1	0	5	11	35	−24	2

Source: rsssf.com

== Semifinals ==
Team 1	Score	Team 2
2 May 1915
Servette	3–2	Young Boys
30 May 1915
Aarau	1–8	Brühl

== Final ==
Team 1	Score	Team 2
6 June 1915
Brühl	3–0	Servette

Brühl St. Gallen won the championship.

== Sources ==
- Switzerland 1914-15 at RSSSF
