= Eduard Bauer (footballer) =

Swiss footballer

Personal information
- Full name: Eduard Bauer
- Date of birth: Unknown
- Place of birth: Switzerland
- Position: Midfielder

Senior career*
Years	Team	Apps	(Gls)
1908–1909	FC Basel	1	(0)
1909–1911	Genoa C.F.C.		
1911–1912	Racing Club de France		
1912–1914	Genoa C.F.C.		
- * Club domestic league appearances and goals

Eduard Bauer (date of birth unknown) was a Swiss footballer who played in the 1910s as midfielder.

== Football career ==
Bauer joined FC Basel's first team from their reserve team during their 1908–09 season. He played his domestic league debut for the first team in the away game on 18 October 1908 as Basel were beaten 1–6 by local rivals Old Boys.

Over the New Year 1909 Basel travelled to Italy to play two games against Genoa. The games were organised as transfer compensation for Daniel Hug who had been signed as professional by Genoa at the beginning of the season. Bauer played in both games. The first game on 1 January 1909 ended with a 2–4 defeat. Bauer scored his first goal for Basel in the second game on 3 January, but it could not help the team because this game ended with a 2–5 defeat.

Bauer liked it so much in Genoa that he stayed there. During his short time with Basel's first team, Bauer played just these three games for Basel scoring that one goal.

Bauer played two seasons with Genoa before he moved on to play one season with Racing Club de France. He stayed in France just one season and then he returned to Italy and again played for Genoa until the outbreak of the first world war.

== Sources ==
- Rotblau: Jahrbuch Saison 2017/2018. Publisher: FC Basel Marketing AG. ISBN 978-3-7245-2189-1
- Die ersten 125 Jahre. Publisher: Josef Zindel im Friedrich Reinhardt Verlag, Basel. ISBN 978-3-7245-2305-5
- Verein "Basler Fussballarchiv" Homepage

(NB: Despite all efforts, the editors of these books and the authors in "Basler Fussballarchiv" have failed to be able to identify all the players, their date and place of birth or date and place of death, who played in the games during the early years of FC Basel.)
