= Anton Rittel =

Swiss footballer

Personal information
- Full name: Anton Rittel
- Date of birth: unknown
- Place of birth: Switzerland
- Positions: Defender; midfielder

Senior career*
Years	Team	Apps	(Gls)
1912–1919	FC Basel	10	(0)
- * Club domestic league appearances and goals

Anton Rittel, also known as Rittel (I) (date of birth unknown) was a Swiss footballer who played for FC Basel as defender or as midfielder.

Rittel joined Basel's first team for their 1912–13 FC Basel season under player-coach and captain Ernst Kaltenbach. Rittel played his domestic league debut for the club in the away game on 17 November 1912 as Basel were defeated 1–2 against FC Bern.

Between the years 1912 and 1919 Rittel played a total of 33 games for Basel without scoring a goal. 15 of these games were in the Nationalliga A and 18 were friendly games.

== Sources ==
- Rotblau: Jahrbuch Saison 2017/2018. Publisher: FC Basel Marketing AG. ISBN 978-3-7245-2189-1
- Die ersten 125 Jahre. Publisher: Josef Zindel im Friedrich Reinhardt Verlag, Basel. ISBN 978-3-7245-2305-5
- Verein "Basler Fussballarchiv" Homepage

(NB: Despite all efforts, the editors of these books and the authors in "Basler Fussballarchiv" have failed to be able to identify all the players, their date and place of birth or date and place of death, who played in the games during the early years of FC Basel)
