= 1916–17 Swiss Serie A =

Swiss football season

Swiss Serie A
- Season: 1916–17

Statistics of Swiss Super League in the 1916–17 season.

== East ==
=== Table ===
Pos	Team	Pld	W	D	L	GF	GA	GD	Pts
1	FC Winterthur	14	12	1	1	57	22	+35	25
2	Blue Stars Zürich	14	9	1	4	38	23	+15	19
3	FC St. Gallen	14	9	1	4	49	32	+17	19
4	FC Zürich	14	7	2	5	40	31	+9	16
5	Brühl St. Gallen	14	7	1	6	24	30	−6	15
6	Young Fellows Zürich	14	4	2	8	27	31	−4	10
7	FC Baden	14	2	1	11	18	47	−29	5
8	Grasshopper Club Zürich	14	1	1	12	16	53	−37	3

Source: rsssf.com

== Central ==
=== Table ===
Pos	Team	Pld	W	D	L	GF	GA	GD	Pts
1	Young Boys Bern	12	8	2	2	31	15	+16	18
2	FC Basel	12	5	5	2	31	20	+11	15
3	FC Aarau	12	5	3	4	23	21	+2	13
4	FC Biel	12	6	0	6	37	45	−8	12
5	Old Boys Basel	12	5	1	6	19	20	−1	11
6	FC Bern	12	3	4	5	23	27	−4	10
7	Nordstern Basel	12	2	1	9	22	38	−16	5

Source: rsssf.com

== West ==
=== Table ===
Pos	Team	Pld	W	D	L	GF	GA	GD	Pts
1	FC La Chaux-de-Fonds	14	12	1	1	43	24	+19	25
2	Lausanne Sports	14	11	1	2	49	22	+27	23
3	Servette Genf	14	6	5	3	40	23	+17	17
4	Etoile La Chaux-de-Fonds	14	5	1	8	39	37	+2	11
5	Cantonal Neuchatel	14	4	3	7	42	44	−2	11
6	FC Genf	14	3	4	7	23	38	−15	10
7	Stella Fribourg	14	3	3	8	26	47	−21	9
8	Montreux Narcisse	14	2	2	10	28	55	−27	6

Source: rsssf.com

== Final ==
=== Table ===
Pos	Team	Pld	W	D	L	GF	GA	GD	Pts
1	FC Winterthur	2	2	0	0	5	2	+3	4
2	FC La Chaux-de-Fonds	2	0	1	1	3	4	−1	1
3	Young Boys Bern	2	0	1	1	1	3	−2	1

Source: rsssf.com

=== Results ===
Team 1	Score	Team 2
3 June 1917
Winterthur	2–0	Young Boys
17 June 1917
Chaux-de-Fonds	1–1	Young Boys
21 June 1917
Winterthur	3–2	Chaux-de-Fonds

FC Winterthur won the championship.

== Sources ==
- Switzerland 1916-17 at RSSSF
