= Paul Bettex =

Swiss footballer (1892-1942)

Personal information
- Full name: Paul Bettex
- Date of birth: 29 July 1892
- Date of death: 6 June 1942 (aged 49)
- Position: Defender

Senior career*
Years	Team	Apps	(Gls)
1912–1918	FC Basel	19	(0)
- * Club domestic league appearances and goals

Paul Bettex (29 July 1892 – 6 June 1942) was a Swiss footballer who played for FC Basel. He played mainly in the position as defender, but also as midfielder.

Between the years 1912 and 1918 Bettex played a total of 27 games for Basel but without scoring a goal. 19 of these games were in the Swiss Serie A, one in the Anglo-Cup and seven were friendly games.

In the 1912–13 season Basel won the Anglo-Cup. However, Bettex did not play in the team that won the final on 29 June 1913 in the Hardau Stadium, Zürich against FC Weissenbühl Bern 5–0.

== Sources and References ==
- Rotblau: Jahrbuch Saison 2017/2018. Publisher: FC Basel Marketing AG. ISBN 978-3-7245-2189-1
- Verein "Basler Fussballarchiv" Homepage
