= Louis Riesterer =

Swiss footballer

Personal information
- Full name: Louis Riesterer
- Place of birth: Switzerland
- Position: Forward

Senior career*
Years	Team	Apps	(Gls)
1915–1920	FC Basel	2	(0)
- * Club domestic league appearances and goals

Louis Riesterer was a Swiss footballer who played for FC Basel as a forward. He also acted many year as referee.

Between the years 1915 and 1920 Riesterer played a total of 11 games for Basel but never scored a goal. Two of these games were in the Swiss Serie A and the other were friendly games. Riesterer's first league match for the club was on 12 March 1916. It was the 46th city derby between BSC Old Boys and FC Basel. The home team, Old Boys, won the game 3–2.

Louis Riesterer was referee for many years. The earliest noted game with Riesterer as referee was the test match FC Basel against Stuttgarter Kickers on 30 August 1913.

== Sources ==
- Rotblau: Jahrbuch Saison 2017/2018. Publisher: FC Basel Marketing AG. ISBN 978-3-7245-2189-1
- Die ersten 125 Jahre. Publisher: Josef Zindel im Friedrich Reinhardt Verlag, Basel. ISBN 978-3-7245-2305-5
- Verein "Basler Fussballarchiv" Homepage
