= Albert Meyer (footballer) =

Swiss footballer

Personal information
- Full name: Albert Meyer
- Date of birth: unknown
- Position: Goalkeeper

Senior career*
Years	Team	Apps	(Gls)
1908–1911	FC Basel	15	(0)
- * Club domestic league appearances and goals

Albert Meyer (date of birth unknown) was a Swiss footballer who played as goalkeeper for FC Basel in the early 1900s.

Meyer joined Basel's first team for their 1908–09 season. He played his first game with the team in the home game in the Landhof on 14 February 1909 as Basel were defeated 1–2 by La Chaux-de-Fonds. He played his domestic league debut for the club in the home game two weeks later, on 28 February, as Basel won 4–2 against Zürich.

During his three seasons with the team Meyer played a total of 32 games for Basel. 15 of these games were in the Nationalliga A, two were in the Anglo Cup and 15 were friendly games.
