= Philipp Leichner =

Swiss footballer

Personal information
- Full name: Philipp Leichner
- Place of birth: Switzerland
- Position: Midfielder

Senior career*
| Years | Team | Apps | (Gls) |
| 1914–1915 | FC Basel | 1 | (0) |
- * Club domestic league appearances and goals

Philipp Leichner was a Swiss footballer. He played as midfielder.

Between the years 1914 and 1915 he played for FC Basel. He was also a member of the FC Basel board of directors. He presided the club's board for a short period during 1915.

== Sources ==
- Rotblau: Jahrbuch Saison 2017/2018. Publisher: FC Basel Marketing AG. ISBN 978-3-7245-2189-1
- Die ersten 125 Jahre. Publisher: Josef Zindel im Friedrich Reinhardt Verlag, Basel. ISBN 978-3-7245-2305-5
- Verein "Basler Fussballarchiv" Homepage
