= Roger Breithaupt =

Swiss footballer

Personal information
- Full name: Roger Breithaupt
- Place of birth: Switzerland
- Position: Midfielder

Senior career*
Years	Team	Apps	(Gls)
1912–1916	FC Basel	13	(0)
- * Club domestic league appearances and goals

Roger Breithaupt (date of birth unknown; date of death unknown) was a Swiss footballer who played for FC Basel. He played mainly in the position as midfielder.

Between the years 1912 and 1916 Breithaupt played a total of 21 games for Basel, of which 13 games were in the Swiss Serie A, one in the Anglo-Cup and seven were friendly games.

In the 1912–13 season Basel won the Anglo-Cup. Bredscheider was part of the team that won the final on 29 June 1913 in the Hardau Stadium, Zürich against FC Weissenbühl Bern 5–0.

== Sources and References ==
- Rotblau: Jahrbuch Saison 2017/2018. Publisher: FC Basel Marketing AG. ISBN 978-3-7245-2189-1
