= Fridolin Wenger =

Swiss footballer

Personal information
- Full name: Fridolin Wenger
- Date of birth: unknown
- Place of birth: Switzerland
- Date of death: 1931
- Place of death: Argentina
- Positions: Goalkeeper; midfielder

Senior career*
Years	Team	Apps	(Gls)
1907–1914	FC Basel	45	(3)
- * Club domestic league appearances and goals

Fridolin Wenger (date of birth unknown; d.1931) was a Swiss footballer who played for FC Basel.

Between the years 1907 and 1914 Wenger played a total of 65 games for Basel. He played mainly in the position as goalkeeper, but he also played out in the field as midfielder. 45 of these games were in the Swiss Serie A, one in the Anglo-Cup and 19 were friendly games. In total he scored seven goals, four of which in test games and three in the domestic league during the FC Basel 1912–13 season.
