= Ernst Gossweiler =

Swiss footballer

Personal information
- Full name: Ernst Gossweiler
- Date of birth: unknown
- Place of birth: Switzerland
- Date of death: unknown
- Position: Midfielder

Senior career*
Years	Team	Apps	(Gls)
1907–1915	FC Basel	28	(2)
- * Club domestic league appearances and goals

Ernst Gossweiler (date of birth unknown; date of death unknown) was a Swiss footballer who played for FC Basel. He played mainly in the position as midfielder.

Between the years 1907 and 1915 Gossweiler played a total of 40 games for Basel scoring two goals. 28 of these games were in the Swiss Serie A, one in the Anglo-Cup and 11 were friendly games. He scored both his goal in the domestic league.

In the 1912–13 season Basel won the Anglo-Cup. Gossweiler was part of the team that won the final on 29 June 1913 in the Hardau Stadium, Zürich against FC Weissenbühl Bern 5–0.

== Sources and References ==
- Rotblau: Jahrbuch Saison 2017/2018. Publisher: FC Basel Marketing AG. ISBN 978-3-7245-2189-1
