= Wilhelm Geisser =

Swiss footballer (1889-1964)

Personal information
- Full name: Wilhelm Geisser
- Date of birth: 1889
- Place of birth: Switzerland
- Date of death: 11 February 1964 (aged 74–75)
- Position: Midfielder

Senior career*
Years	Team	Apps	(Gls)
1909–1923	FC Basel	68	(0)
- * Club domestic league appearances and goals

Wilhelm Geisser (born in 1889 – 11 February 1964) was a Swiss footballer who played for FC Basel as midfielder.

Geisser joined FC Basel's first team during their 1909–10 season. He played his domestic league debut for the club in the away game on 12 December 1909 as Basel won 2–1 against Luzern.

In their 1912–13 season Basel won the Anglo-Cup, a forerunner to the Swiss Cup. The Englishman Percy Humphreys was the first professional trainer that the club FC Basel had ever employed. He signed his contract and began his duties on 1 April 1913. The Anglo-Cup was held for the fourth time this season and the first round was held on 1 May. Geiser was in the team that won the final on 29 June 1913 in the Hardau Stadium, Zürich against FC Weissenbühl Bern 5–0. Humphreys led Basel to win their first national title. But memories of this soon faded, because the Anglo Cup was not played the following year and in fact it was discontinued completely due to World War I.

Between the years 1909 and 1923 Geisser played a total of 102 games for Basel without scoring a goal. 68 of these games were in the Swiss Serie A, three in the Anglo-Cup and 31 were friendly games.

== Sources ==
- Rotblau: Jahrbuch Saison 2017/2018. Publisher: FC Basel Marketing AG. ISBN 978-3-7245-2189-1
- Die ersten 125 Jahre. Publisher: Josef Zindel im Friedrich Reinhardt Verlag, Basel. ISBN 978-3-7245-2305-5
- Verein "Basler Fussballarchiv" Homepage

(NB: Despite all efforts, the editors of these books and the authors in "Basler Fussballarchiv" have failed to be able to identify all the players, their date and place of birth or date and place of death, who played in the games during the early years of FC Basel)
