= Karl Wunderle =

Swiss footballer

Personal information
- Full name: Karl Wunderle
- Date of birth: unknown
- Place of birth: Switzerland
- Date of death: unknown
- Position: Forward

Senior career*
Years	Team	Apps	(Gls)
1909–1916	FC Basel	54	(13)
- * Club domestic league appearances and goals

Karl Wunderle (date of birth unknown; date of death unknown) was a Swiss footballer who played for FC Basel. He played mainly in the position as striker, but also as midfielder.

Between the years 1909 and 1916 Wunderle played a total of 104 games for Basel scoring a total of 22 goals. 54 of these games were in the Swiss Serie A, four in the Anglo-Cup and 46 were in friendly or so called test games. He scored 13 goal in the domestic league, the other nine were scored during the test games.

In the 1912–13 season Basel won the Anglo-Cup. Wunderle was part of the team that won the final on 29 June 1913 in the Hardau Stadium, Zürich against FC Weissenbühl Bern 5–0.

== Sources and References ==
- Rotblau: Jahrbuch Saison 2017/2018. Publisher: FC Basel Marketing AG. ISBN 978-3-7245-2189-1
