= Hermann Moll (footballer) =

Swiss footballer (1891-1974)

Personal information
- Full name: Hermann Moll
- Date of birth: 16 April 1891
- Place of birth: Switzerland
- Date of death: 1974
- Position: Defender

Senior career*
Years	Team	Apps	(Gls)
1908–1927	FC Basel	82	(6)
- * Club domestic league appearances and goals

Hermann Moll (16 April 1891 – 1974), known simply as Bobby, was a Swiss footballer who played as defender, but also as midfielder, during the 1910s and 1920s.

Moll joined FC Basel's first team for their 1908–09 season. He played his domestic league debut for the club in the away game on 19 October 1908 as Basel were defeated 1–6 by local rivals Old Boys. He scored his first goal for his club in the test game on 28 March 1909 in the home game in the Landhof as Basel won 4–0 against FC Bern. Moll scored his first domestic league goal for the team some four years later on 30 November 1913 in the away game as Basel won 7–2 against Old Boys.

In the 1912–13 season, Basel won the Anglo-Cup. Moll was in the team that won the final on 29 June 1913 in the Hardau Stadium, Zürich against FC Weissenbühl Bern 5–0.

Moll played for Basel for 19 years and between the years 1908 and 1927 he played a total of 147 games for Basel. 82 of these games were in the Swiss Serie A, three in the Anglo-Cup, and 62 were friendly games. He scored a total of 20 goals, six of which in the domestic league, one in the Anglo-Cup, and 13 in the friendlies.

== Sources ==
- Rotblau: Jahrbuch Saison 2017/2018. Publisher: FC Basel Marketing AG. ISBN 978-3-7245-2189-1
- Die ersten 125 Jahre. Publisher: Josef Zindel im Friedrich Reinhardt Verlag, Basel. ISBN 978-3-7245-2305-5
- Verein "Basler Fussballarchiv" Homepage
