= Fritz Albicker =

Swiss footballer (1893–1959)

Personal information
- Full name: Fritz Albicker (II)
- Date of birth: 1893
- Place of birth: Switzerland
- Date of death: 15 October 1959 (aged 65–66)
- Position: Midfielder

Senior career*
Years	Team	Apps	(Gls)
1910–1917	FC Basel	8	(0)
- * Club domestic league appearances and goals

Fritz Albicker (II) (1893 - 15 October 1959) was a Swiss footballer who played for FC Basel.

Albicker was born in 1893.

Between the years 1910 and 1917 Albicker played a total of 24 games, scoring one goal, for Basel. Eight of these games were in the Swiss Serie A and 16 were friendly games. He played mainly as midfielder.

== Sources and References ==
- Rotblau: Jahrbuch Saison 2017/2018. Publisher: FC Basel Marketing AG. ISBN 978-3-7245-2189-1
