= Ernst Kaltenbach =

Swiss footballer (1889-1965)

Personal information
- Date of birth: 7 February 1889
- Place of birth: Basel, Switzerland
- Date of death: 10 October 1965 (aged 76)
- Position: Midfielder

Senior career*
Years	Team	Apps	(Gls)
1909–1927	FC Basel	147	(20)

International career
1911–1922	Switzerland	13	(0)
- * Club domestic league appearances and goals

Ernst Kaltenbach (born 7 February 1889 – 10 October 1965) was a Swiss footballer who played as a midfielder.

== Club career ==
Kaltenbach started his playing career with Basel in 1909 and played for the first team until 1927. During this time the FCB played in the Swiss Serie A. Kaltenbach played a total of 275 games for Basel, of which 147 games were in the national championship, five in the Anglo-Cup and 123 in friendly/test games. He scored 20 goals in the domestic league, three in the Anglo-Cup and 26 in the friendly games.

In the 1912–13 season Basel won the Anglo-Cup. Kaltenbach was part of the team that won the final on 29 June 1913 in the Hardau Stadium, Zürich against FC Weissenbühl Bern 5–0.

On 24 April 1921, Kaltenbach played in a comparison match between a Berlin city selection and FC Basel, in front of 35,000 spectators, he was honoured as best Basel players. Basel achieved a 3–3 draw, despite having previously travelled over 19 hours by train. In the domestic championship FC Basel had almost suffered relegation from Serie-A during that same season.

== International career ==
Kaltenbach was one of the pioneers of Swiss football and from 1911 to 1922 obtained a total of 13 caps for the Switzerland national team. In his first international match, on 30 October 1911 in Budapest, the Swiss suffered a 9–0 defeat against Hungary (their highest defeat to date). His last international match, eleven years later, was also a comparison with the Hungarians in Budapest, this time the game resulted in an honorable 1–1 draw.

In Zurich, on 27 June 1920 in the 4–1 victory over Germany Kaltenbach was the Swiss captain. That game was the first appearance of a German selection after the First World War.

== Personal life ==
Dr. Phil Ernst Basler Kaltenbach was a middle school teacher. He shaped the early history of FC Basel not only as player. In 1916, he was one of the initiators and founders of the FC Basel youth section. From 29 October 1924 he was the editor of the "Swiss football and athletics newspaper", and later wrote for the German magazine "Kicker" about Swiss football and wrote for the sports newspaper "Tip".

== Honours ==
FC Basel

- Anglo Cup (Predecessor competition of the Swiss Cup): 1912/13

== Sources and references ==
- Rotblau: Jahrbuch Saison 2014/2015. Publisher: FC Basel Marketing AG. ISBN 978-3-7245-2027-6
