= FC Winterthur =

Association football club from Winterthur

Winterthur
- Full name: Fussballclub Winterthur
- Nicknames: Rot-Weiss (Red and White)
- Short name: FCW
- Founded: 1896; 130 years ago
- Ground: Schützenwiese, Winterthur, Switzerland
- Capacity: 8,550 (1,901 seated)
- Chairman: Mike Keller
- Manager: Patrick Rahmen
- League: Swiss Challenge League
- 2025–26: Swiss Super League, 12th of 12 (relegated)
- Website: fcwinterthur.ch
Home colours	Away colours	Third colours

FC Winterthur is a Swiss football club based in Winterthur, Canton of Zürich. They play in the Swiss Challenge League, the second tier of Swiss football, and appeared regularly in the Nationalliga A during the 20th century. Their home is the Stadion Schützenwiese.

== History ==
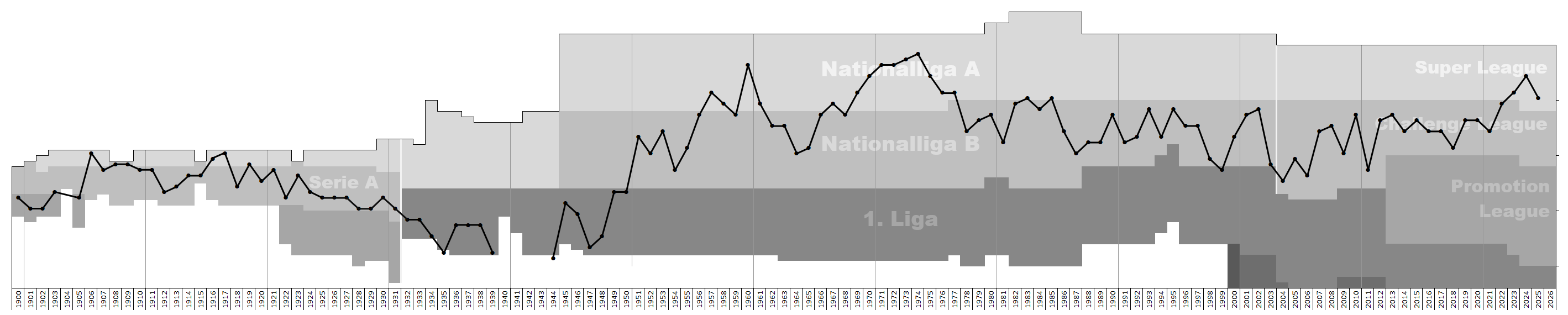
Chart of FC Winterthur table positions in the Swiss football league system

The club was founded in 1896 by students of the local school of engineering and following a fusion with two local teams, it was called Vereinigte Fussballclubs Winterthur between 1929 and 1946. They enjoyed their best success in the early part of the 20th century winning the Swiss Championship three times (in 1906, 1908 and 1917), before consecutive relegations in 1931 and 1934. They played in the lower leagues until regaining promotion to the Nationalliga B in 1950. They have since stayed in the second division for most of their history, except for several appearances in the Nationalliga A, from where they were most recently relegated in 1978 following a promotion ten years prior. Notable managers from this period include Gabet Chapuisat, Wolfgang Frank, René Hüssy, Timo Konietzka, and Willy Sommer

They famously lost to West Auckland F.C., an English amateur team in what is thought to be the first international football club competition, the Sir Thomas Lipton Trophy. The club have also reached the final of the Swiss League Cup in 1972 and 1973 and Swiss Cup in 1968 and 1975, however lost on every occasion.

In 2005–06 season the club finished 14th place in the Challenge League. Despite performing poorly in the league, they made it to the semi-finals of the Swiss Cup by defeating Grasshoppers, Lucerne and Servette, before losing to eventual winners Sion at home.

In the 2021–22 season, Winterthur were able to achieve a last round championship victory in the Swiss Challenge League, to gain their first promotion to the Swiss Super League. It will be the first time since 1982 that the team played in the top Swiss football league. It is their fourth victory in the second Swiss football league. Following their promotion, coach Alex Frei, who led the team during this successful season, departed the team to join FC Basel, along with assistant coach Davide Callà. They're replaced by Bruno Berner and Aurélien Mioch.

Due to the expansion of the Super League for the 2023–24 season, there would be no direct relegation in Winterthur's first season back in the top flight, as the last placed team would advance to the relegation playoff. The goal for the season therefore was clear: avoid the relegation and secure a spot in the Super League for the next year. This still proved to be a difficult task, as they initially struggled with the higher pace and efficient exploitation of weaknesses in the top flight, most exemplified by their 0–6 home loss to FC Luzern in the eight round. Winterthur still managed to secure a spot in the Super League for the next season, as they narrowly avoided the relegation play-off, ending the season one point above FC Sion. Despite this success and one year left on his contract, coach Berner departed to club following the conclusion of the season, to return to his boyhood club and cantonal rivals Grasshopper Club Zürich. Former FC Basel and Switzerland U21 coach Patrick Rahmen was announced as his replacement on 14 June 2023.

== Players ==
=== Current squad ===
As of 28 September 2026

Note: Flags indicate national team as defined under FIFA eligibility rules; some limited exceptions apply. Players may hold more than one non-FIFA nationality.

No.	Pos.	Nation	Player
1	GK	AUT	Markus Kuster
2	DF	SUI	Sambou Camara
6	MF	GHA	Emmanuel Essiam (on loan from Basel)
7	MF	SUI	Luca Zuffi
8	MF	SUI	Théo Golliard
9	FW	SUI	Roman Buess
10	FW	SUI	Nishan Burkart
11	FW	GER	Emilio Kehrer
16	DF	SUI	Remo Arnold
18	DF	UGA	Souleymane Diaby
19	MF	SUI	Yannis Odin
20	MF	SUI	Antonio Marchesano
21	DF	SUI	Severin Ottiger

No.	Pos.	Nation	Player
22	FW	BIH	Aldin Turkeš
26	DF	KOS	Ledjan Sahitaj
27	MF	SUI	Fabian Rohner
30	GK	SUI	Noah Brogli
33	DF	SUI	Tibault Citherlet
37	MF	SUI	Elias Maluvunu
40	DF	SUI	Tobias Okafor
44	MF	CPV	Stéphane Cueni
45	MF	SUI	Alexandre Jankewitz
68	FW	FRA	Brian Beyer
70	MF	SUI	Giuliano Foro
75	GK	SUI	Antonio Spagnoli
81	FW	SUI	Niko Cavka

=== Out on loan ===
Note: Flags indicate national team as defined under FIFA eligibility rules; some limited exceptions apply. Players may hold more than one non-FIFA nationality.

No.	Pos.	Nation	Player
—	MF	KOS	Leandro Maksutaj (at Kriens until 30 June 2027)

== Stadium ==
The club play at Stadion Schützenwiese, a short walk from the centre of Winterthur, having done so since their inception in 1896. The first grandstand was built in 1922, and then replaced in 1957 using sponsorship money.

In the 1980s the ownership was transferred to Winterthur council as the club faced financial problems. The council are responsible for any maintenance and upkeep.

While once boasting a capacity of 14,987 before 2009, the stadium now holds 8,550 seats, 1,900 of which are seated. The more hardcore supporters of the club stand at one end, which is known as the Bierkurve. They also have a small stand for younger supporters known as the Sirupkurve. Away supporters are housed at the opposite end of the stadium to the Bierkurve.

== Honours ==
- Swiss Super League
  - Winners (3): 1905–06, 1907–08, 1916–17
  - Runners-up (2): 1908–09, 1915–16
- Swiss Challenge League
  - Winners (4): 1965–66, 1967–68, 1981–82, 2021–22
  - Runners-up (1): 1983–84
- Swiss Cup
  - Runners-up (2): 1967–68, 1974–75

== Former coaches ==
- (Switzerland) Martin Rueda (2000–2001)
- (Switzerland) Walter Grüter (2001)
- (Switzerland) Urs Schönenberger (2001–2002)
- (Czech Republic) Ivan Koritschan (2002–2003)
- (Germany) Hans-Joachim Weller (2003)
- (Italy) Gianni Dellacasa (2003–2004)
- (Switzerland) Mathias Walther (2004–2009)
- (Croatia) Boro Kuzmanović (2009–2014)
- (Germany) Jürgen Seeberger (2014–2015)
- (Switzerland) Alex Frei (2021–2022)
- (Switzerland) Bruno Berner (2022–2023)
- (Switzerland) Patrick Rahmen (2023–2024)
- (Serbia) Ognjen Zarić (2024)
- (Switzerland) Uli Forte (2024–2025)
- (Switzerland) Patrick Rahmen (2025–)

== Coaching staff ==
Position	Name
Head coach	TBD
Assistant coaches	(Austria) Dietmar Eichner (Switzerland) Reto Wiesmann (Switzerland) Florian Kühn
Goalkeeper coach	(Switzerland) Thomas Schnegg
Fitness coach	(Switzerland) Dietmar Schneiderfeldt
Match analyst	(Switzerland) Jens Gassmann
Performance coach	(Switzerland) Florian Keller
Team doctors	(Switzerland) Dr. Heidi Kunze (Switzerland) Dr. Jakob Kerstenhardt
Physiotherapists	(Switzerland) Fabian Werner (Switzerland) Fritz Hofer (Switzerland) Philipp Flick (Switzerland) Torsten Krautzheimer
Team coordinator	(Switzerland) Joachim Wolfinger
Sport director	(Switzerland) Steffen Hoffmann
Press officer	(Switzerland) Niklas Zimmermann

== See also ==
- Category:FC Winterthur players
