= 1926–27 FC Basel season =

FC Basel
1926–27 season
- Chairman: Franz Rinderer
- First team coach: Karl Bielser (as team captain)
- Ground: Landhof, Basel
- Serie A: Group Stage: 4th
- Swiss Cup: Round of 64
- Top goalscorer: League: Emil Arlt (12); All: Emil Arlt (12)
- Highest home attendance: 3,000 on 31 October 1926 vs Nordstern Basel and on 3 January 1927 vs Grenchen and on 13 February 1927 vs Young Boys
- Lowest home attendance: 1,000 on 20 March 1927 vs FC Bern
- Average home league attendance: 2,162

The FC Basel 1926–27 season was their thirty fourth season since the club's foundation on 15 November 1893. The club's new chairman was Franz Rinderer. It was Rinderer's third period as chairman. He took over the presidency from Carl Burkhardt at the AGM. FC Basel played their home games in the Landhof in the district Wettstein in Kleinbasel.

== Overview ==
Karl Bielser was team captain for the second season in a row and as captain he led the team trainings and was responsible for the line-ups. Basel played a total of 32 matches in their 1926–27 season. 16 of these were in the domestic league, one was in the Swiss Cup and 15 were friendly matches. Of these 15 friendlies only two were played at home in the Landhof and 13 were away games, six in Switzerland, five in France and two un Germany. Eight of these games were won, one was drawn and six ended with a defeat. The team scored 33 goals in these friendlies, but conceded 37.

An interesting match among these friendlies this season, was the away game against Bayern Munich. Not because of the result, because Basel were defeated 0–10, but because of the goalscorer Josef Pöttinger. Pöttinger was not only for his club, but also for the German national team, one of the most effective goal scorers of his time. On the 3 April 1927, as Basel played in Munich, Pöttinger scored a "perfect" hat-trick within the first 12 minutes (3', 10', 12') of the match and in the second half he scored five consecutive goals (52', 60', 62', 68', 83').

As in the previous year, this is season the Serie A was divided into three regional groups, each group with nine teams. Basel were allocated to the Central group together with local clubs Concordia Basel, Nordstern Basel and Old Boys Basel. The other teams allocated to this group were Young Boys Bern, FC Bern, Aarau, Grenchen and Solothurn. The teams that won each group continue to the finals and the last placed teams in the groups had to play a barrage against relegation. FC Basel played a mediocre season, winning eight matches, drawing three and suffering five defeats, scoring 29 goals and conceding 26. With 19 points they ended the season in fourth position, six points behind group winners Nordstern and the Young Boys, both of whom were level on points. Nordstern won the play-off 1–0 and advanced to the finals. Grasshopper Club won the championship, Nordstern were runner-up and Biel-Bienne were third. Aarau were the bottom placed team and won the promotion/relegation play-off against FC Madretsch.

In the round of 64 in the Swiss Cup Basel were drawn against Old Boys, but were eliminated in this round because they lost the match 0–2. Grasshopper Club won the cup, winning the final 3–1 against Young Fellows Zürich.

== Players ==
Squad members

Note: Flags indicate national team as defined under FIFA eligibility rules; some limited exceptions apply. Players may hold more than one non-FIFA nationality.

No.	Pos.	Nation	Player
—	GK	SUI	Ernst Christ
—	GK	SUI	Arthur Fahr
—	GK	SUI	Ernst Zorzotti
—	DF	SUI	Armando Ardizzoia
—	DF	FRG	Hermann Enderlin (II)
—	DF	SUI	Alfred Heidig
—	DF	SUI	Hermann Moll
—	DF	AUT	Gustav Putzendopler (I)
—	DF	SUI	Peter Riesterer
—	MF	SUI	Louis Blindenbacher
—	MF	SUI	? Flubacher
—	MF	SUI	Max Galler (II)
—	MF	SUI	Georg Heimann
—	MF	SUI	Ernst Kaltenbach
—	MF	SUI	Otto Meier

No.	Pos.	Nation	Player
—	MF	AUT	Karl Putzendopler (II)
—	MF	SUI	Paul Schaub
—	MF	SUI	Jacques Steiner
—	MF	SUI	Emil Arlt
—	FW	SUI	Karl Bielser
—	FW	SUI	Fritz Bölle
—	FW	SUI	François Comte .
—	FW	SUI	Alfred Enderlin (I)
—	FW	FRA	Max Lehmann
—	FW	SUI	Paul Nebiker
—	FW	SUI	Max Oswald
—	FW	SUI	Hans Rau
—	FW	SUI	Alfred Schlecht
—	FW	SUI	Max Strasser
—	FW	SUI	Hans Streng
—	FW	SUI	Franz Zeiser

Left the squad

Note: Flags indicate national team as defined under FIFA eligibility rules; some limited exceptions apply. Players may hold more than one non-FIFA nationality.

No.	Pos.	Nation	Player
—	GK	SUI	Arnold Wyssling
—	MF	SUI	Karl Wangler
—	FW	SUI	Jules Düblin
—	FW	SUI	Arnold Hürzeler

No.	Pos.	Nation	Player
—	FW	SUI	Ernst Nyffeler
—	FW	SUI	Hans Schneider (II)
—	FW	SUI	August von Arx
—	FW	SUI	Curt Wellauer

== Results ==
Legend

Win Draw Loss Postponed

=== Friendly matches ===
==== Pre- and mid-season ====
15 August 1926 Pre-season	St. Gallen (Switzerland)	2–3	(Switzerland) Basel	Espenmoos, St. Gallen
	Marcolini (1:0); Heim (2:1)	Summary	(1:1) Emil Arlt (2:2) Putzendopler (II) (2:3) Schlecht

28 August 1926 Pre-season	Concordia Basel (Switzerland)	2–0	(Switzerland) Basel	Landhof, Basel
16:15	Zorzotti 40' (o.g. 1:0); Hürzeler 85' (2:0)	Summary		Attendance: 1,000; Referee: (Switzerland) Feurer Delémont

19 September 1926 Mid-season	FC Saint-Louis (France)	2–4	(Switzerland) Basel	Stade de la Frontière, Saint-Louis
	Dalben (1:0); Zink (2:4)	Summary	(1:1) (1:2) (1:3) (1:4)	Attendance: 600

==== Winter break to end of season ====
26 December 1926 Winter break	Lugano (Switzerland)	6–0	(Switzerland) Basel	Campo Marzio, Lugano
	Poretti 20' (1:0); Perucconi 24' (2:0); Fink (3:0); Sturzenegger (4:0); Poretti 44' (5:0); Sturzenegger (6:0)	Summary		Attendance: 2,000; Referee: (Switzerland) Regazzoni Chiasso

23 January 1927 Mid-season	Mulhouse (France)	2–6	(Switzerland) Basel	Mulhouse
	Brodie (1:2); Moll 40' (o.g. 2:3)	Summary	10' (o.g. 0:1); 15' (0:2) Arlt (1:3) Schlecht (2:4) Enderlin (I) (2:5) Arlt (2:6) Bielser	Attendance: 100; Referee: (Switzerland) Roesch Mulhouse

13 March 1927 Mid-season	Cantonal Neuchâtel (Switzerland)	1–1	(Switzerland) Basel	Neuchâtel
15:00	Fenat 75' (1:1)	Summary	18' (0:1) Arlt	Attendance: 800; Referee: (Switzerland) Jacques Hirrle Basel

27 March 1927 Mid-season	AS Valentigney (France)	1–2	(Switzerland) Basel	Valentigney
	Goal	Summary	Goal	Referee: (Switzerland) Pachoud Bern

3 April 1927 Mid-season	Bayern Munich (West Germany)	10–0	(Switzerland) Basel	München
	Pöttinger 3' (1:0); Pöttinger 10' (2:0); Pöttinger 12' (3:0); Dietl 15' (4:0); Schmid (II) 43' (5:0); Pöttinger 52' (6:0); Pöttinger 60' (7:0); Pöttinger 62' (8:0); Pöttinger 68' (9:0); Pöttinger 83' (10:0)	Summary		Attendance: 8,000

17 April 1927 Mid-season	Royal Antwerp (Belgium)	2–1 (a.e.t.)	(Switzerland) Basel	Paris
	Goal	Summary	Goal

18 April 1927 Mid-season	CASG Paris (France)	1–0	(Switzerland) Basel	Paris
	Goal	Summary

24 April 1927 Mid-season	FC Liestal (Switzerland)	1–2	(Switzerland) Basel	Liestal
	Goal	Summary	Goal

24 April 1927 Mid-season	Basel (Switzerland)	2–0	(Switzerland) Cantonal Neuchâtel	Landhof, Basel
	Riesterer (1:0); Riesterer (2:0)	Summary

26 May 1927 End of season	Basel (Switzerland)	7–2	(Switzerland) Lausanne-Sport	Landhof, Basel
15:00	Bielser 5' (1:0); Arlt (2:1); Arlt (3:1); Oswald (4:2); Bielser (5:2); Arlt (6:2); Bielser (7:2)	Summary	(1:1) (3;2)	Attendance: 800; Referee: (Switzerland) Brodbeck Basel

5 June 1927 End of season	Black Stars Basel (Switzerland)	1–3	(Switzerland) Basel	Sportplatz Neu-Allschwil Allschwil
15:00	Sormants (1:0)	Summary	(1:1) Lehmann (1:2) Galler (1:3) Lehmann	Attendance: 300; Referee: (Switzerland) Plüss Basel

12 June 1927 End of season	Freiburger FC (West Germany)	4–2	(Switzerland) Basel	Sportplatz am Haagenersträsschen, Lörrach
	Bantle (1:1) (2:1); Streng (3:2); Eberhard (4:2)	Summary	(pen. 0:1) (2:2)	Attendance: 1,800; Referee: (Switzerland) Müller Beiertheim/Karlsruhe

=== Serie A ===
==== Central Group results ====
5 September 1926 Round 1	Basel	2–2	Solothurn	Landhof, Basel
15:00	Rau 3' (1:0); Bielser 55' (2:1)	Summary	(1:1) Jäggi (IV) (2:2) Jäggi (I)	Attendance: 1,500; Referee: (Switzerland) Pedrotta Zürich

12 September 1926 Round 2	Young Boys	1–1	Basel	Wankdorf Stadium, Bern
	Schlecht 60' (1:0)	Summary	63' (1:1) Brendle	Attendance: 2,500; Referee: (Switzerland) Blum Zürich

26 September 1926 Round 3	Basel	0–0	Aarau	Landhof, Basel
15:00		Summary		Attendance: 1,800; Referee: (Switzerland) Weber St. Gallen

10 October 1926 Round 4	Old Boys	1–4	Basel	Stadion Schützenmatte, Basel
15:00	Schneebeli 15' (1:0)	Summary	47' (1:1) Schlecht; 70' (1:2) Arlt; 80' (1:3) Arlt; 83' (1:4) Schlecht	Attendance: 1,500; Referee: (Switzerland) Pedrotta Zürich

17 October 1926 Round 5	Grenchen	5–0	Basel	Stadion Brühl, Grenchen
	Schüpbach (I) 30' (1:0); Righetti 40' (2:0); Righetti (3:0); Righetti (4:0); Dubois (5:0)	Summary	(red card) Rau	Attendance: 1,500; Referee: (Switzerland) Demartines Lausanne

24 October 1926 Round 6	Concordia Basel	0–1	Basel	Landhof, Basel
14:00		Summary	57' (0:1) Arlt	Attendance: 1,200; Referee: (Switzerland) Fritz Beuchat Bern

31 October 1926 Round 7	Basel	1–2	Nordstern Basel	Landhof, Basel
15:00	Schlecht 34' (1:1)	Summary	31' (0:1) Flubacher; 70' (1:2) Hossli	Attendance: 3,000; Referee: (Switzerland) Edm. Dizerens Lausanne

21 November 1926 Round 8	FC Bern	0–1	Basel	Neufeld, Bern
		Summary	47' (0:1) Arlt	Attendance: 1,000; Referee: (Switzerland) Schumacher La Chaux-de-Fonds

5 December 1926 Round 9	Aarau	0–1	Basel	Stadion Brügglifeld, Aarau
		Summary	66' (0:1) Schlecht	Attendance: 300; Referee: (Switzerland) Blum Zürich

12 December 1926 Round 10	Basel	3–1	Old Boys	Landhof, Basel
14:30	Rau 32' (1:0); Enderlin (I) 57' (2:1); Enderlin (I) 87' (3:1)	Summary	41' (1:1) Lorenzini	Attendance: 2,000; Referee: (Switzerland) Ruegg Thalwil

16 January 1927 Round 11	Solothurn	2–4	Basel	Stadion FC Solothurn, Solothurn
	Jäggi (IV) (1:1); Hänzi (2:4)	Summary	15' (0:1) Arlt (1:2) Arlt (1:3) Schlecht (1:4)	Referee: (Switzerland)

30 January 1927 Round 12	Basel	3–4	Grenchen	Landhof, Basel
14:30	Arlt (1:0); Bielser 74' (2:4); Riesterer 75' (3:4)	Summary	(1:1) (pen. 1:2) Vuillemin; 57' (1:3); 60' (1:4) Righetti	Attendance: 3,000; Referee: (Switzerland) Blum Zürich

13 February 1927 Round 13	Basel	0–2	Young Boys	Landhof, Basel
15:00		Summary	40' (0:1) Brendle (0:2) Brendle	Attendance: 3,000; Referee: (Switzerland) Ruegg Thalwil

27 February 1927 Round 14	Nordstern Basel	4–1	Basel	Stadion Rankhof, Basel
15:00	Meier 3' (1:0); Leonhard (2:0); Bucco 15' (3:0); Flubacher 50' (4:0)	Summary	60' (4:1) Arlt	Attendance: 3,500; Referee: (Switzerland) Pedrotta Zürich

20 March 1927 Round 15	Basel	6–2	FC Bern	Landhof, Basel
15:00	Arlt 3' (1:0); Ardizzoia (2:0); Arlt (3:1); Arlt 24' (4:1); Arlt 55' (5:1); Enderlin (I) (6:1)	Summary	6' (2:1) Weiss; 70' (6:2) Amrein	Attendance: 1,000; Referee: (Switzerland) Mercet Locarno

14 May 1927 Round 16	Basel	1–0	Concordia Basel	Landhof, Basel
15:30	Bielser 5' (1:0)	Summary		Attendance: 2,000; Referee: (Switzerland) Spengler Olten

==== Central Group table ====
Pos	Team	Pld	W	D	L	GF	GA	GD	Pts	Qualification
1	Nordstern Basel	16	10	5	1	39	17	+22	25	Group play-off winners / Advance to finals
2	Young Boys Bern	16	10	5	1	30	10	+20	25	Group play-off
3	FC Grenchen	16	8	4	4	34	22	+12	20	
4	FC Basel	16	8	3	5	29	26	+3	19	
5	FC Bern	16	7	4	5	38	24	+14	18	
6	Old Boys Basel	16	4	4	8	23	33	−10	12	
7	FC Solothurn	16	2	7	7	23	35	−12	11	
8	FC Concordia Basel	16	4	1	11	17	37	−20	9	
9	FC Aarau	16	2	1	13	11	40	−29	5	Relegation play-off

Source: rsssf.com

=== Swiss Cup ===
3 October 1926 Round of 64	Basel	0–2 (a.e.t.)	Old Boys	Landhof, Basel
14:00		Summary	94' (0:1) Müller; 99' (0:2)	Attendance: 2,000; Referee: (Switzerland) Blum Zürich

== See also ==
- History of FC Basel
- List of FC Basel players
- List of FC Basel seasons

== Sources ==
- Rotblau: Jahrbuch Saison 2014/2015. Publisher: FC Basel Marketing AG. ISBN 978-3-7245-2027-6
- Die ersten 125 Jahre. Publisher: Josef Zindel im Friedrich Reinhardt Verlag, Basel. ISBN 978-3-7245-2305-5
- FCB team 1925–26 at fcb-archiv.ch
- Switzerland 1926-27 at RSSSF
