= 1927–28 FC Basel season =

FC Basel
1927–28 season
- Chairman: From 8 July to 15 September 1927; Karl Junker; From 15 September; Karl Ibach
- First team coach: Karl Bielser (as team captain); Peter Riesterer (as team captain)
- Ground: Landhof, Basel
- Serie A: Group Stage: 3rd
- Swiss Cup: Round of 64
- Top goalscorer: League: Karl Wüthrich (8); All: Karl Wüthrich (8)
- Highest home attendance: 3,500 on 9 October 1927 vs Nordstern Basel and on 29 April 1928 vs Old Boys Basel
- Lowest home attendance: 1,500 on 22 January 1928 vs Concordia Basel
- Average home league attendance: 2,700

The FC Basel 1927–28 season was their thirty fifth season since the club's foundation on 15 November 1893. The club's new chairman was Karl Junker took over the presidency from Carl Burkhardt at the AGM on 8 July 1927. However Junker only remained as president until 15 September, then Karl Ibach took over for his third period. FC Basel played their home games in the Landhof in the district Wettstein in Kleinbasel.

== Overview ==
Karl Bielser was team captain for the third season in a row and as captain he led the team trainings and was responsible for the line-ups. During the season Peter Riesterer took over as team captain and he acted as team coach from then onwards. Basel played a total of 27 matches in their 1927–28 season. 16 of these were in the domestic league, one was in the Swiss Cup and 10 were friendly matches. Of these 10 friendlies four were played at home in the Landhof and six were away games. Apart from the away game against Mulhouse all other matches were in Switzerland. The team won four of the friendly games and lost the other six. They scored 20 goals and conceded 26.

Probably one of the biggest highlights during these friendly games, was the fixture in the Landhof against Everton, who had just won the English Football League championship that season. The game attracted 8,000 supporters, but Basel lost the comparison against the English champions by two goals to nil. Both goals were scored by Dixie Dean. Dean's greatest point of note is that he is still the only player in English football to score 60 league goals in one season and this (1927–28) was the season in that he accomplished this record. At that the end of that season he was 21 years old.

The 1927–28 Swiss Serie A was divided into three regional groups, each group with nine teams. Basel were allocated to the Central group together with the other three local clubs Concordia Basel, Nordstern Basel and Old Boys Basel. The other five teams allocated to this group were Young Boys Bern, FC Bern, Aarau, Grenchen and Solothurn. The teams that won each group continue to the finals and the last placed teams in the groups had to play a barrage against relegation. FC Basel played a good season, won ten matches, one was drawn and they suffered five defeats. Basel scored 27 goals and conceded 21. With 21 points they ended the season in third position, two points behind group winners and local rivals Nordstern. Nordstern advanced to the finals. Grasshopper Club won the championship, Nordstern were runner-up and Étoile Carouge were third. Solothurn finished the season in last position and competed the promotion/relegation play-off against Luzern. Winning the first match and drawing the second leg they retained their place in the top tier of Swiss football.

In this season's Swiss Cup Basel were drawn against Young Fellows Zürich in the first round and were eliminated because they lost 0–1. Servette won the cup, beating Grasshopper Club 5–1 in the final.

== Players ==
Squad members

Note: Flags indicate national team as defined under FIFA eligibility rules; some limited exceptions apply. Players may hold more than one non-FIFA nationality.

No.	Pos.	Nation	Player
—	GK	SUI	Ernst Christ
—	GK	SUI	Arthur Fahr
—	GK	SUI	Ernst Zorzotti
—	DF	SUI	Armando Ardizzoia
—	DF	SUI	Jakob Bürgin
—	DF	FRG	Hermann Enderlin (II)
—	DF	SUI	Peter Riesterer
—	MF	SUI	Max Galler (II)
—	MF	SUI	Georg Heimann
—	MF	SUI	Otto Meier
—	MF	SUI	Paul Schaub
—	FW	SUI	Emil Arlt
—	FW	SUI	Karl Bielser

No.	Pos.	Nation	Player
—	FW	FRG	Alfred Enderlin (I)
—	DF	SUI	Fritz Gerster
—	FW	FRA	Max Lehmann
—	DF	SUI	Louis Matthey
—	FW	SUI	Max Oswald
—	FW	SUI	Hans Rau
—	FW	SUI	Alfred Schlecht
—	FW	SUI	Max Strasser
—	FW	SUI	Hans Streng
—	DF	SUI	Gustav Vogt
—	FW	SUI	Karl Wüthrich
—	FW	SUI	Franz Zeiser
—	FW	SUI	? Weber

Players who left the squad

Note: Flags indicate national team as defined under FIFA eligibility rules; some limited exceptions apply. Players may hold more than one non-FIFA nationality.

No.	Pos.	Nation	Player
—	DF	SUI	Alfred Heidig
—	DF	SUI	Hermann Moll
—	DF	AUT	Gustav Putzendopler (I)
—	MF	SUI	Louis Blindenbacher
—	MF	SUI	? Flubacher

No.	Pos.	Nation	Player
—	MF	SUI	Ernst Kaltenbach
—	MF	AUT	Karl Putzendopler (II)
—	MF	SUI	Jacques Steiner
—	FW	SUI	Fritz Bölle
—	FW	SUI	François Comte
—	FW	SUI	Paul Nebiker

== Results ==
Legend

Win Draw Loss Postponed

=== Friendly matches ===
==== Pre- and mid-season ====
14 August 1927 Pre-season	Basel (Switzerland)	2–4	(Switzerland) Young Fellows Zürich	Landhof, Basel
15:00	Enderlin (I) 3' (1:0); Enderlin (I) (pen. 2:4)	Summary	5' (1:1) Muntwiler; 15' (1:2) Brendle; 30' (1:3) Ulrich; 50' (1:4) Ulrich	Attendance: 800; Referee: (Switzerland) Plütz Basel

21 August 1927 Pre-season	Lausanne-Sport (Switzerland)	3–5	(Switzerland) Basel	Olympique de la Pontaise, Lausanne
16:00	Syrvet 27' (1:1); Syrvet 62' (2:3); Fauguel 65' (3:3)	Summary	25' (0:1) Arlt; 33' (1:2) Arlt; 47' (1:3) Enderlin (I); 87' (3:4) Enderlin (I); 90' (3:5) Enderlin (I)	Referee: (Switzerland) Demartines Lausanne

28 August 1927 Pre-season	Basel (Switzerland)	4–2	(Switzerland) Black Stars	Landhof, Basel
15:00	Bielser (pen. 1:1); Enderlin (I) (2:1); Strasser 25' (3:1); Streng (4:2)	Summary	5' (0:1) Bechtel (3:2) Ehrismann	Attendance: 800; Referee: (Switzerland) G. Rupprecht Basel

21 November 1927 Mid-season	SC Schweizerischer Bankverein BS (Switzerland)	0–6	(Switzerland) Basel	Basel
		Summary	Goal

==== Winter break ====
15 January 1928 Winter break	Mulhouse (France)	4–3	(Switzerland) Basel	Stade de Bourtzwiller Mulhouse
	Bilger (1:1); Arny (2:3); Zolg (3:3); Steiner (4:3)	Summary	(0:1) Bielser (1:2) Wüthrich (pen. 1:3)	Attendance: 1,000; Referee: (France) Munsch

29 January 1928 Winter break	Chiasso (Switzerland)	4–0	(Switzerland) Basel	Chiasso
700	Grassi 46' (1:0) (2:0) (3:0) (4:0)	Summary

25 March 1928 Mid-season	Zürich (Switzerland)	0–1	(Switzerland) Basel	Letzigrund, Zürich
		Summary	Enderlin (I)	Attendance: 2,000; Referee: (Switzerland)

15 April 1928 Mid-season	Luzern (Switzerland)	5–0	(Switzerland) Basel	Luzern
	(2x) Zimmermann (I) (1x) Waldis (1x) Sormani (1x o.g.)	Summary

12 May 1928 End of season	Basel (Switzerland)	0–2	(England) Everton	Landhof, Basel
17:00		Summary	18' (0:1) Dean; 60' (0:2) Dean	Attendance: 8,000; Referee: (Switzerland) Felix Herren Basel

17 May 1928 End of season	Basel (Switzerland)	0–2	(France) Mulhouse	Landhof, Basel
15:00		Summary	35' (0:1) Kaufmann; 48' (0:2) Lieb	Attendance: 1,500; Referee: (Switzerland) Hans Wüthrich Bern

=== Serie A ===
==== Central Group results ====
4 September 1927 Round 1	FC Bern	3–2	Basel	Neufeld, Bern
	Ramseyer 8' (1:0); Brand (2:0); Brand (3:2)	Summary	(2:1) Arlt (2:2) Schlecht	Attendance: 1,800; Referee: (Switzerland) Nagel St. Gallen

25 September 1927 Round 2	Solothurn	1–3	Basel	Sportplatz Steinbrugg, Solothurn
	Dreyer 5' (1:0)	Summary	18' (1:1) Schlecht (1:2) Schlecht; 75' (1:3) Enderlin (I)	Attendance: 500; Referee: (Switzerland) Voisard Biel/Bienne

9 October 1927 Round 3	Basel	1–0	Nordstern Basel	Landhof, Basel
15:00	Schlecht 27' (1:0)	Summary		Attendance: 3,500; Referee: (Switzerland) Müller Winterthur

16 October 1927 Round 4	Aarau	2–0	Basel	Stadion Brügglifeld, Aarau
	Roomberg 30' (1:0); Imhof (II) 47' (2:0)	Summary		Attendance: 1,500; Referee: (Switzerland) Edm. Dizerens Lausanne

30 October 1927 Round 5	Basel	0–5	Young Boys	Landhof, Basel
15:00		Summary	10' (0:1) Nyffeler; 35' (0:2) Gründer; 65' (0:3); 85' (0:4) Minder; 88' (0:5) Dasen	Attendance: 2,500; Referee: (Switzerland) Voisard Biel/Bienne

20 November 1927 Round 6	Old Boys	2–3	Basel	Stadion Schützenmatte, Basel
14:30	Bossi 12' (1:0); Bossi 62' (2:2)	Summary	57' (1:1) Arlt; 60' (1:2) Wüthrich; 65' (2:3) Enderlin (I)	Attendance: 1,500; Referee: (Switzerland) Demartines Lausanne

27 November 1927 Round 7	Basel	2–1	Grenchen	Landhof, Basel
13:00	Wüthrich 52' (1:0); Wüthrich (2:1)	Summary	(1:1) Dubois	Referee: (Switzerland) Spengler Olten

4 December 1927 Round 8	Nordstern Basel	0–1	Basel	Stadion Rankhof, Basel
14:30		Summary	47' (0:1) Rau	Attendance: 2,500; Referee: (Switzerland) Edm. Dizerens Lausanne

11 December 1927 Round 9	Young Boys	0–0	Basel	Wankdorf Stadium, Bern
		Summary		Attendance: 3,000; Referee: (Switzerland) Schumacher La Chaux-de-Fonds

18 December 1927 Round 10	Concordia Basel	0–1	Basel	Landhof, Basel
14:30		Summary	52' (pen. 0:1) Enderlin (I)	Referee: (Switzerland) Demartines Lausanne

22 January 1928 Round 11	Basel	2–1	Concordia Basel	Landhof, Basel
14:3.	Wüthrich 1' (1:0); Enderlin (I) 51' (2:0)	Summary	61' (2:1) Kielmeyer	Attendance: 1,500; Referee: (Switzerland) Edm. Dizerens Lausanne

12 February 1928 Round 12	Basel	1–2	FC Bern	Landhof, Basel
14:30	Wüthrich 41' (1:1)	Summary	19' (o.g. 0:1); 87' (1:2) Brand	Attendance: 1,900; Referee: (Switzerland) Voisard Biel/Bienne

19 February 1928 Round 13	Basel	4–0	Solothurn	Landhof, Basel
15:00	Wüthrich 25' (1:0); Enderlin (I) 70' (2:0); Oswald (3:0); Wüthrich 80' (4:0)	Summary		Attendance: 3,000; Referee: (Switzerland) Mercet Locarno

4 March 1928 Round 14	Basel	3–1	Aarau	Landhof, Basel
15:00	Wüthrich 19' (1:0); Oswald 23' (2:0); Oswald 64' (3:0)	Summary	75' (3:1) Lüthy	Attendance: 3,000; Referee: (Switzerland) Voisard Biel/Bienne

1 April 1928 Round 15	Grenchen	3–2	Basel	Stadion Brühl, Grenchen
	Schüpbach (II) (1:1); Schüpbach (II) (2:2); Schüpbach (II) 87' (3:2)	Summary	15' (o.g. 0:1) (1:2) Enderlin (I)	Attendance: 600; Referee: (Switzerland) Brüschweiler Zürich

29 April 1928 Round 16	Basel	2–0	Old Boys	Landhof, Basel
13:45	Bielser 39' (1:0); Enderlin (I) 43' (2:0)	Summary		Attendance: 3,500; Referee: (Switzerland) Allemann Biel/Bienne

==== Central Group table ====
Pos	Team	Pld	W	D	L	GF	GA	GD	Pts	Qualification
1	Nordstern Basel	16	10	3	3	40	11	+29	23	Group winners / Advance to finals
2	Young Boys	16	9	4	3	34	10	+24	22	
3	Basel	16	10	1	5	27	21	+6	21	
4	Aarau	16	8	4	4	27	19	+8	20	
5	FC Bern	16	7	3	6	32	22	+10	17	
6	Grenchen	16	5	3	8	20	33	−13	13	
7	Concordia Basel	16	5	1	10	26	38	−12	11	
8	Old Boys	16	4	2	10	15	40	−25	10	
9	Solothurn	16	2	3	11	16	43	−27	7	Relegation play-off

Source: rsssf.com

=== Swiss Cup ===
2 October 1927 Round of 64	Basel	0–1	Young Fellows Zürich	Landhof, Basel
15:15		Summary	60' (0:1) Winkler	Referee: (Switzerland) Edm. Dizerens Lausanne

== See also ==
- History of FC Basel
- List of FC Basel players
- List of FC Basel seasons

== Sources ==
- Rotblau: Jahrbuch Saison 2014/2015. Publisher: FC Basel Marketing AG. ISBN 978-3-7245-2027-6
- Die ersten 125 Jahre. Publisher: Josef Zindel im Friedrich Reinhardt Verlag, Basel. ISBN 978-3-7245-2305-5
- FCB team 1927–28 at fcb-archiv.ch
- Switzerland 1927-28 at RSSSF
