= 1925–26 FC Basel season =

FC Basel
1925–26 season
- Chairman: Carl Burkhardt
- First team coach: Karl Bielser (as team captain)
- Ground: Landhof, Basel
- Serie A: Group Stage: 2nd
- Swiss Cup: Round of 32
- Top goalscorer: League: Arnold Hürzeler (8); All: Arnold Hürzeler (15)
- Highest home attendance: 3,200 on 7 February 2016 vs Young Boys
- Lowest home attendance: 1,400 on 13 May 2016 vs FC Bern
- Average home league attendance: 2,000

The FC Basel 1925–26 season was their thirty third season since the club's foundation on 15 November 1893. The club's new chairman was Carl Burkhardt. It was Burkhardt's second period as chairman. At the AGM he took over the presidency from Karl Ibach. FC Basel played their home games in the Landhof in the district Wettstein in Kleinbasel.

== Overview ==
Karl Bielser was team captain this season and as captain he led the team trainings and was responsible for the line-ups. Basel played a total of 33 matches in their 1925–26 season. 16 of these were in the domestic league, two were in the newly created Swiss Cup and 15 were friendly matches. Of these 15 friendlies four were played at home in the Landhof and 11 were away games, five in Switzerland and three each in France and Germany. Four of these games were won, four draws and seven defeats. 29 goals were scored, but 32 were conceded.

During these friendly games, a highlight was the fixture in the Landhof as Huddersfield Town visited. Huddersfield had just won the English Football League championship for the third consecutive season. The game attracted 3,500 supporters. Basel lost the match against the English champions by five goals to one.

As in the previous seasons, this is season the Serie A was divided into three regional groups, each group with nine teams. Basel were allocated to the Central group together with local clubs Concordia Basel, Nordstern Basel and Old Boys Basel. The other teams allocated to this group were Young Boys Bern, FC Bern, Aarau, Grenchen and the newly promoted Solothurn. The teams that won each of the three groups would continue to the finals and the last placed teams in the groups had to play a play-off against relegation.

Basel visited the group newcomers for the first match and promptly lost 1–2. Following this initial shock, the team played twelve games in succession undefeated. However, only six of these games were won and six were drawn and at this point, despite having defeated the league leaders Young Boys, they were trailing by five points. Basel lost their last two home games and thus ended the season in second position. During their league season Basel won seven of their matches, drawing six and were defeated three times. They were nine points adrift of Young Boys, who continued to the finals. Servette won the championship, Grasshopper Club were runners-up and YB were classified third. Grenchen ended the group stage at the bottom of the table and had to play the promotion/relegation play-off against Black Stars Basel, who had won the second tier championship. The teams each won one of the play-off matches and Grenchen won the deciding match to remain in the top tier.

In their 16 league matches the team scored 26 goals and conceded 14. Arnold Hürzeler, who had joined the team for this season, was the team's top league goal scorer with eight goals. He left the club after the season. Karl Bielser was second best league scorer with seven goals. Jules Düblin, Karl Putzendopler and Alfred Schlecht each scored two league goals.

The very first Swiss Cup tournament was organised this season by the Swiss Football Association (and has been organised by them annually since then). In the first round Basel were drawn against lower tier FC Horgen and the game took place on 4 October 1925. Basel won their first cup match 8–1 and Arnold Hürzeler proved his goal scoring qualities by securing the victory for his team by scoring six of the goals. In the next round, however, Basel were eliminated against Aarau, after a draw, by toss of a coin. Grasshopper Club won the final on 11 April 1926, played in the Letzigrund, 2–1 against FC Bern.

== Players ==
Squad members

Note: Flags indicate national team as defined under FIFA eligibility rules; some limited exceptions apply. Players may hold more than one non-FIFA nationality.

No.	Pos.	Nation	Player
—	GK+FW	SUI	Arthur Fahr
—	GK	SUI	Arnold Wyssling
—	GK	SUI	Ernst Zorzotti
—	DF	SUI	Armando Ardizzoia
—	DF	SUI	Alfred Heidig
—	DF	AUT	Gustav Putzendopler (I)
—	DF	SUI	Peter Riesterer
—	MF	SUI	Max Galler (II)
—	MF	SUI	Georg Heimann
—	MF	SUI	Ernst Kaltenbach
—	MF	AUT	Karl Putzendopler (II)
—	MF	SUI	Jacques Steiner

No.	Pos.	Nation	Player
—	MF	SUI	Karl Wangler
—	FW	SUI	Karl Bielser
—	FW	SUI	Fritz Bölle
—	FW	SUI	Jules Düblin
—	FW	SUI	Arnold Hürzeler
—	FW	SUI	Paul Nebiker
—	FW	SUI	Ernst Nyffeler
—	FW	SUI	Hans Rau
—	FW	SUI	Alfred Schlecht
—	FW	SUI	Hans Schneider (II)
—	FW	SUI	Max Strasser
—	FW	SUI	August von Arx
—	FW	SUI	Curt Wellauer

== Results ==
Legend

Win Draw Loss Postponed

=== Friendly matches ===
==== Pre- and mid-season ====
23 August 1925 Pre-season	Luzern (Switzerland)	1–1	(Switzerland) Basel	Luzern
	Waldis (pen. 1:1)	Summary	(0:1)

30 August 1925 Pre-season	FC Bern (Switzerland)	2–0	(Switzerland) Basel	Stade de la Maladière (1924), Neuchâtel
11:00	Amrain (1:0); Kirschner 88' (2:0)	Summary

30 August 1925 Pre-season	Cantonal Neuchâtel (Switzerland)	1–0	(Switzerland) Basel	Stade de la Maladière (1924), Neuchâtel
14:30	Abegglen III (1:0)	Summary

20 September 1925 Mid-season	AS Montbéliard (France)	0–6	(Switzerland) Basel	Montbéliard
		Summary	Goal

27 September 1925 Mid-season	Grasshopper Club (Switzerland)	4–4	(Switzerland) Basel	Hardturm, Zürich
13:30	Frankenfeldt (1:1); Neuenschwander (2:1); Frankenfeldt (3:2); Frankenfeldt (pen. 4:2)	Summary	(0:1) Strasser (pen. 2:2) Galler (4:3) Hürzeler (4:4) Hürzeler	Attendance: 2,000; Referee: (Switzerland)

==== Winter break to end of season ====
3 January 1926 Winter break	Basel (Switzerland)	0–2	(Austria) 1. Simmeringer SC	Landhof, Basel
14:30		Summary	1' (1:0) Seszta (0:2) Urban	Attendance: 2,000; Referee: (Switzerland) Jacques Hirrle Basel

31 January 1926 Mid-season	Baden (Switzerland)	4–5	(Switzerland) Basel	Baden
	Weber 1' (1:0); Weber (2:3); Diebold (3:3); Egli (4:5)	[ Summary]	(1:1) Strasser; 30' (1:2) Bielser; 39' (1:3) Heidig (3:4) Bielser (3:5) Bielser	Referee: (Switzerland) Gloor Baden

28 March 1926 Mid-season	Basel (Switzerland)	0–4	(Switzerland) Étoile-Sporting	Landhof, Basel
15:00		Summary	(0:1) (0:2) (0:3) (0:4)	Attendance: 1,000; Referee: (Switzerland) Feurer Delémont

3 April 1924 Mid-season	FC Viktoria Hanau (West Germany)	2–1	(Switzerland) Basel	Hanau
	Goal	Summary	Goal

4 April 1926 Mid-season	Kickers Offenbach (West Germany)	1–0	(Switzerland) Basel	Offenbach
	(1:0)	Summary

8 April 1926 Mid-season	1. FSV Mainz 05 (West Germany)	2–3	(Switzerland) Basel	Mainz
	Kaiser (1:2); Lipponer (2:2)	Summary	2' (0:1) Schlecht (0:2) Nyffeler (2:3)

24 April 1926 Mid-season	Red Star F.C. (France)	4–0	(Switzerland) Basel	Stade de Paris, Paris
		Summary	(0:1) Schlecht (0:2) Schlecht (0:3) Schlecht (0:4) Strasser

25 April 1926 Mid-season	Olympique Lillois (France)	3–3	(Switzerland) Basel	Stade Henri-Jooris, Lille
	(1:0) (2:0) (3:1)	Summary	(2:1) Nebiker (3:2) Nyffeler (3:3) Schlecht

25 May 1926 Mid-season	Basel (Switzerland)	1–5	(England) Huddersfield Town	Landhof, Basel
18:15	(1:5)	Summary	(0:1) (0:2) (0:3) (0:4) (0:5)	Attendance: 3,500; Referee: (Switzerland) Felix Herren Basel

6 June 1926 End of season	Basel (Switzerland)	1–1	(Switzerland) Young Boys	Landhof, Basel
15:00	Schlecht (1:0)	Summary	(1:1) Müllheim	Attendance: 2,500; Referee: (Switzerland) Jacques Hirrle Basel

=== Serie A ===
==== Central Group results ====
6 September 1925 Round 1	Solothurn	2–1	Basel	Sportplatz Steinbrugg, Solothurn
	Jäggi IV 14' (1:0); Jäggi IV (2:0)	Summary	(2:1) Galler	Attendance: 800; Referee: (Switzerland)

13 September 1925 Round 2	Basel	7–0	Concordia Basel	Landhof, Basel
15:00	Putzendopler (II) 25' (1:0); Hürzeler (2:0); Bielser (3:0); Hürzeler (4:0); Bölle (5:0); Hürzeler (6:0); Bielser (7:0)	Summary		Attendance: 1,800; Referee: (Switzerland) Weidmann Töss

18 October 1925 Round 3	Basel	1–0	Grenchen	Landhof, Basel
13:15	Putzendopler (II) (1:0)	Summary		Attendance: 1,800; Referee: (Switzerland) Teichmann Zürich

15 November 1925 Round 4	Young Boys	1–1	Basel	Wankdorf Stadium, Bern
	Poretti 17' (1:1)	Summary	10' (0:1) Bielser	Attendance: 4,000; Referee: (Switzerland) Rutschmann Vevey

22 November 1925 Round 5	Basel	2–2	Old Boys	Landhof, Basel
14:45	Hürzeler (1:2); Hürzeler (2:2)	Summary	(1:0) Wüthrich (2:0) Wüthrich	Attendance: 1,800; Referee: (Switzerland) Weidmann Töss

6 December 1925 Round 6	Basel	1–1	Solothurn	Landhof, Basel
14:30	Hürzeler (1:0)	Summary	72' (1:1) Reichle	Attendance: 1,000; Referee: (Switzerland) Spengler Olten

20 December 1925 Round 7	Basel	1–1	Nordstern Basel	Landhof, Basel
14:30	Hürzeler 5' (1:0)	Summary	50' (1:1) Christen	Attendance: 2,500; Referee: (Switzerland) Ruegg Thalwil

27 December 1925 Round 8	FC Bern	0–0	Basel	Neufeld, Bern
		Summary		Attendance: 800; Referee: (Switzerland) Spengler Olten

10 January 1926 Round 9	Aarau	1–1	Basel	Stadion Brügglifeld, Aarau
	Hürzeler (1:1)	Summary	43' (0:1) Hürzeler	Attendance: 1,200; Referee: (Switzerland) Edm. Dizerens Lausanne

7 February 1929 Round 10	Basel	2–0	Young Boys	Landhof, Basel
15:00	Bielser (1:0); Bielser (2:0)	Summary		Attendance: 3,200; Referee: (Switzerland) Ruegg Thalwil

14 February 1926 Round 11	Old Boys	0–2	Basel	Stadion Schützenmatte, Basel
15:00		Summary	30' (0:1) Schlecht; 52' (0:2) Bielser	Attendance: 3,000; Referee: (Switzerland) Fritz Beuchat Bern

21 February 1926 Round 12	Nordstern Basel	0–1	Basel	Stadion Rankhof, Basel
15:00	Afflerbach (red card)	Summary	15' (0:1) Düblin	Attendance: 3,000; Referee: (Switzerland) Felix Herren Basel

28 February 1926 Round 13	Grenchen	1–2	Basel	Stadion Brühl, Grenchen
	Righetti 80' (1:2)	Summary	48' (o.g. 0:1) Kropf; 67' (0:2) Riesterer	Referee: (Switzerland) Gremminger Oberwinterthur

7 March 1926 Round 14	Basel	1–3	Aarau	Landhof, Basel
15:00	Schlecht 20' (1:1)	Summary	12' (0:1) (1:2) Dreier; 60' (1:3) Imhof	Attendance: 2,500; Referee: (Switzerland) Fritz Beuchat Bern

13 May 1929 Round 15	Basel	0–2	FC Bern	Landhof, Basel
15:00		Summary	25' (0:1) Bürgisser; 87' (0:2) Molteni	Attendance: 1,400; Referee: (Switzerland) Felix Herren Basel

29 May 1926 Round 16	Concordia Basel	0–3	Basel	Landhof, Basel
17:30		Summary	(0:1) Strasser (0:2) Bielser (0:3) Düblin	Attendance: 500; Referee: (Switzerland) Felix Herren Basel

==== Central Group table ====
Pos	Team	Pld	W	D	L	GF	GA	GD	Pts	Qualification
1	Young Boys	16	14	1	1	46	10	+36	29	Advance to finals
2	Basel	16	7	6	3	26	14	+12	20	
3	FC Bern	16	9	2	5	28	16	+12	20	
4	Nordstern Basel	16	8	2	6	34	31	+3	18	
5	Solothurn	16	7	1	8	30	31	−1	15	
6	Aarau	16	6	3	7	29	36	−7	15	
7	Old Boys	16	5	2	9	24	31	−7	12	
8	Concordia Basel	16	3	2	11	15	49	−34	8	
9	Grenchen	16	3	1	12	27	41	−14	7	Relegation play-off

Source: rsssf.com

=== Swiss Cup ===
4 October 1925 Round of 64	Basel	8–1	FC Horgen	Landhof, Basel
15:00	Hürzeler (6x); Strasser (1x); Wegmüller (o.g. 1x)	Summary	Pfitsch	Attendance: 1,500; Referee: (Switzerland) Ritter La Chaux-de-Fonds

1 November 1925 Round of 32	Basel	1–1 (Note: Aarau win on Toss of a coin)	Aarau	Landhof, Basel
15:00	Hürzeler (1:0)	Summary	(1:1) Hürzeler	Attendance: 1,200; Referee: (Switzerland) Fritz Beuchat Bern
Note: After 82 minutes, with the score at 1–0, the game was interrupted due to the falling darkness. The Aarau captain Imhof demanded the game to be abandoned, due to shortsightedness of some players. Basel also requested that the game be abandoned. The referee does not accept the suggestion and after several minutes of discussion, the game continued. Due to the darkness, extra time could not be played and the game should have been replayed. The two clubs could not agree to a date. The FCB was ultimately eliminated by toss of a coin.

== See also ==
- History of FC Basel
- List of FC Basel players
- List of FC Basel seasons

== Sources ==
- Rotblau: Jahrbuch Saison 2014/2015. Publisher: FC Basel Marketing AG. ISBN 978-3-7245-2027-6
- Die ersten 125 Jahre. Publisher: Josef Zindel im Friedrich Reinhardt Verlag, Basel. ISBN 978-3-7245-2305-5
- FCB team 1925–26 at fcb-archiv.ch
- Switzerland 1925-26 at RSSSF
