= 1923–24 FC Basel season =

FC Basel
1923–24 season
- Chairman: Karl Ibach
- First team coach: Max Breunig
- Ground: Landhof, Basel
- Serie A: Group Stage: 3rd
- Top goalscorer: League: Otto Kuhn (4); All: Otto Kuhn (8)
- Highest home attendance: 6,300 on 30 March 1924 vs Young Boys
- Lowest home attendance: 1,500 on 6 January 1924 vs Luzern
- Average home league attendance: 3,042

The FC Basel 1923–24 season was their thirty first season since the club's foundation on 15 November 1893. The club's chairman was Karl Ibach. It was his second season as chairman in his second period as chairman. FC Basel played their home games in the Landhof in the district Wettstein in Kleinbasel.

== Overview ==
The ex-German international Max Breunig was the first team trainer for the second successive season.

Basel played a total of 30 matches in this season. 16 of these were in the domestic league and 14 were friendly matches. Of these 14 friendlies, three were home games played in the Landhof and 11 were away games. Seven test games ended in a victory and seven ended in a defeat. In these tests Basel scored a total of 39 goals and conceded 35. Of these friendlies, six were during the pre-season, and one was a mid-season. Because the domestic league had no real winter break the other seven were played after group stage had been completed.

There were a few modifications to the Swiss football league system, this season the number of clubs was increased from 24 to 27 teams. Again, the league was again divided into three regional groups, East, Central and West, now each group with nine teams. The last team in each group had to play a barrage against relegation. FC Basel were allocated to the Central group and now there were four teams from the city of Basel. The others being Concordia Basel, who were newly promoted, Nordstern Basel and Old Boys Basel. The further teams allocated to this group were Young Boys Bern, FC Bern, Aarau, Luzern and Biel-Bienne.

Basel started their season unfavourably, losing four of the first five games. Despite improving during the rest of the season, they could not close the gap to the leading two teams and they finished the group in third position with 18 points, seven points behind Young Boys and eight behind local rivals Nordstern who won the group and continued to the finals. East group winners Zürich won the championship, Nordstern were runners-up and West group winners Servette were third. Basel won eight of their matches, drawing two and suffered six defeats. Basel scored 16 goals and conceded 15.

Therefore, the problem seems to be because of their strikers, because the team scored just 16 goals in 16 matches. Otto Kuhn was the team's top league goal scorer in the league season with just four goals. Alfred Schlecht scored three, Heinrich Hess, Karl Putzendopler and Karl Wüthrich each scored two goals and Arthur Fahr scored one. The other two goal scorers were not recorded.

== Players ==
Squad members

Note: Flags indicate national team as defined under FIFA eligibility rules; some limited exceptions apply. Players may hold more than one non-FIFA nationality.

No.	Pos.	Nation	Player
—	GK	SUI	Theodor Schär
—	GK	SUI	Arnold Wyssling
—	DF	AUT	Gustav Putzendopler (I)
—	DF	SUI	Peter Riesterer
—	MF	SUI	Walter Rupprecht
—	MF	SUI	Max Galler (II)
—	MF	SUI	Ernst Kaltenbach
—	MF	SUI	Otto Kuhn
—	MF	AUT	Karl Putzendopler (II)
—	FW	SUI	Arthur Fahr
—	FW	SUI	Karl Bielser
—	FW	SUI	Paul Dietz (II)
—	FW	SUI	Eugen Haas
—	FW	SUI	Gottlieb Häusselmann

No.	Pos.	Nation	Player
—	FW	SUI	Heinrich Hess
—	FW	SUI	Paul Nebiker
—	FW	SUI	Hans Rau
—	FW	SUI	Alfred Schlecht
—	FW	SUI	Fritz Schneider (I)
—	FW	SUI	Curt Wellauer
—	FW	SUI	Karl Wüthrich
—	FW	SUI	Franz Zeiser
—		SUI	Wilhelm Flubacher
—		SUI	Hans Schneider (II)
—			Ernst Hasler (II)
—			Eduard Schaub
—			Hans Strung
—			Hans Vogt

== Results ==
Legend

Win Draw Loss Postponed

=== Friendly matches ===
==== Pre-season and mid-season ====
1 July 1923 Pre-season	Borussia Neunkirchen (Germany)	3–1	(Switzerland) Basel	Neunkirchen
	Goal	Summary	Goal

26 August 1923 Pre-season	La Chaux-de-Fonds (Switzerland)	5–1	(Switzerland) Basel	Parc des Sports, La Chaux-de-Fonds
14:45	Ottolini 20' (1:0); Donzé (2:1); Theurillat (3:1); Donzé (4:1); Theurillat (5:1)	Summary	(1:1) Schneider (I)	Referee: (Switzerland) Paul Reutter

1 September 1923 Pre-season	Grasshopper Club (Switzerland)	0–7	(Switzerland) Basel	Hardturm, Zürich
15:30		Summary	(4x) Wüthrich (2x) Schneider (I) (1x) Kuhn	Attendance: 1,000

2 September 1923 Pre-season	Bayern München (Germany)	6–1	(Switzerland) Basel	Hardturm, Zürich
16:30	Hierländer (1:0) (2:0) (3:0); Hierländer (4:1) (5:1); Hierländer (6:1)	Summary	(3:1) Dietz (II)	Attendance: 2,000

9 September 1923 Pre-season	Basel (Switzerland)	1–4	(Switzerland) Young Fellows Zürich	Landhof, Basel
15:00	Rosset (o.g. 1:1)	Summary	(0:1) Meyer (1:2) Leiber (1:3) Meyer (1:4) Meyer	Attendance: 1,000; Referee: (Switzerland) Kaltenbach Basel

16 September 1923 Pre-season	Black Stars Basel (Switzerland)	1–3	(Switzerland) Basel	Sportplatz Neu-Allschwil Allschwil
15:00	Hummel (1:2)	Summary	(1x) Haas (1x) Schneider (I) (1x) Wüthrich	Attendance: 800; Referee: (Switzerland) Felix Herren Basel

25 November 1923 Mid-season	St. Gallen (Switzerland)	3–2	(Switzerland) Basel	St. Gallen
	Angehrn (1:0); Bühler (2:0); Townley (3:1)	Summary	(2:1) (3:2)

==== End of season ====
23 March 1924 Mid-season	Baden (Switzerland)	1–4	(Switzerland) Basel	Baden
	Goal	Summary	Goal

18 April 1924 End of season	Bremer SC (Germany)	2–3	(Switzerland) Basel	Bremen
	70' (1:3) (2:3)	Summary	(0:1) Haas (0:2) Rau (0:3) Schneider

19 April 1924 End of season	SC Victoria Hamburg (Germany)	2–1	(Switzerland) Basel	Stadion Hoheluft, Hamburg
17:30	Westphalen (1:0); Hartmann (pen. 2:1)	Summary	(1:1) Riesterer	Referee: (Switzerland)

21 April 1924 End of season	Geestemünder SC (Germany)	2–4	(Switzerland) Basel	Geestemünde
	Goal	Summary	(2x) Rau (1x) Kuhn (1x) Putzendopler (I)	Referee: (Switzerland)

4 May 1924 End of season	Basel (Switzerland)	6–1	(Switzerland) St. Gallen	Landhof, Basel
15:00	Fahr 20' (1:0); Hess (2:0); Hess (3:1); Fahr (4:1); Kuhn (5:1); Wellauer (6:1)	Summary	(2:1) Townley	Attendance: 800; Referee: (Switzerland) Hafner Basel

25 May 1924 End of season	Zürich (Switzerland)	3–0	(Switzerland) Basel	Letzigrund, Zürich
	Hauser; Manter; Pfändler	Summary		Attendance: 300; Referee: (Switzerland)

29 May 1924 End of season	Basel (Switzerland)	5–2	(Switzerland) Zürich	Landhof, Basel
15:00	Kuhn (1:0); Hess (2:0); Fahr (3:0); Rau (4:1) ? (5:1)	Summary	(3:1) Haufer (5:2) Mantel	Attendance: 1,000; Referee: (Switzerland) Kaltenbach Basel

=== Serie A ===
==== Central Group results ====
30 September 1923 Round 1	Nordstern Basel	2–1	Basel	Landhof, Basel
15:00	Hossli 20' (1:1); Hossli (2:1)	Summary	(0:1) Schlecht	Attendance: 2,500; Referee: (Switzerland) Ruegg Thalwil

7 October 1923 Round 2	Luzern	0–1	Basel	Tribschen, Luzern
		Summary	85' (pen.)	Attendance: 500; Referee: (Switzerland) Koblet Winterthur

14 October 1923 Round 3	Basel	1–4	Old Boys	St. Jakob Stadium, Basel
15:00	Fahr 43' (1:3)	Summary	(0:1) Brack; 8' (0:2) Wionsowsky; 18' (0:3) Merkt; 65' (pen. 1:4) Wionsowsky	Attendance: 3,000; Referee: (Switzerland) John Forster La Chaux-de-Fonds

24 October 1923 Round 4	Aarau	1–0	Basel	Schachen, Aarau
	Imhof (II) (pen.)	Summary		Referee: (Switzerland) Guido Eichenberger Bern

28 October 1923 Round 5	Young Boys	1–0	Basel	Spitalacker, Bern
	R. Ramseyer 89' (pen.)	Summary		Attendance: 4,000; Referee: (Switzerland) John Forster La Chaux-de-Fonds

11 November 1923 Round 6	Basel	1–0	Biel-Bienne	Landhof, Basel
13:30	Hess 15' (1:0)	Summary		Attendance: 2,500; Referee: (Switzerland) Spengler Olten

9 December 1923 Round 7	Basel	2–1	FC Bern	Landhof, Basel
14:45	Wüthrich (1:0); Wüthrich (2:0)	Summary	74' (2:1) Amrein	Referee: (Switzerland) Edm. Dizerens Lausanne

16 December 1923 Round 8	Basel	1–0	Concordia Basel	Landhof, Basel
	Kuhn (1:0)	Summary		Attendance: 2,000; Referee: (Switzerland) Koblet Winterthur

6 January 1924 Round 9	Basel	2–2	Luzern	Landhof, Basel
14:45	Putzendopler (II) 48' (1:2); Schlecht (2:2)	Summary	5' (0:1) Arnold (0:2) Waldis	Attendance: 1,500; Referee: (Switzerland) Epiney Geneva

13 January 1924 Round 10	FC Bern	3–1	Basel	Kirchenfeld, Bern
	Wenger (1:0); Motta (2:1); Wenger (3:1)	Summary	(1:1) Schlecht	Attendance: 1,800; Referee: (Switzerland) Epiney Geneva

27 January 1924 Round 11	Basel	1–0	Nordstern Basel	Landhof, Basel
14:45	Kuhn 86' (1:0)	Summary		Attendance: 3,500; Referee: (Switzerland) Koblet Winterthur

3 February 1924 Round 12	Biel-Bienne	0–1	Basel	Gurzelen Stadion, Biel/Bienne
		Summary	85' (0:1) Hess	Attendance: 2,000; Referee: (Switzerland) Edm. Dizerens Lausanne

10 February 1924 Round 13	Old Boys	0–2	Basel	Stadion Schützenmatte, Basel
14:45		Summary	(0:1) Kuhn (0:2) Putzendopler (II)	Attendance: 2,000; Referee: (Switzerland) Koblet Winterthur

17 February 1924 Round 14	Concordia Basel	1–0	Basel	Basel
14:45	Feralli 65' (1:0)	Summary		Attendance: 1,000; Referee: (Switzerland) Guido Eichenberger Bern

9 March 1923 Round 15	Basel	2–0	Aarau	Landhof, Basel
15:00	Schneider (1:0); Kuhn 75' (2:0)	Summary		Attendance: 2,500; Referee: (Switzerland) Sandoz La Chaux-de-Fonds

30 March 1923 Round 16	Basel	0–0	Young Boys	Landhof, Basel
15:00		Summary		Attendance: 6,300; Referee: (Switzerland) Spengler Olten

==== Central Group table ====
Pos	Team	Pld	W	D	L	GF	GA	GD	Pts	Qualification
1	Nordstern Basel	16	11	4	1	34	10	+24	26	Advance to finals
2	Young Boys	16	10	5	1	28	9	+19	25	
3	Basel	16	8	2	6	16	15	+1	18	
4	Old Boys	16	6	5	5	29	26	+3	17	
5	FC Bern	16	4	6	6	25	31	−6	14	
6	Aarau	16	4	4	8	14	20	−6	12	
7	Concordia Basel	16	4	3	9	19	31	−12	11	
8	Luzern	16	4	3	9	13	30	−17	11	
9	Biel-Bienne	16	3	4	9	13	19	−6	10	Relegation play-off

Source: rsssf.com

== See also ==
- History of FC Basel
- List of FC Basel players
- List of FC Basel seasons

== Sources ==
- Rotblau: Jahrbuch Saison 2014/2015. Publisher: FC Basel Marketing AG. ISBN 978-3-7245-2027-6
- Die ersten 125 Jahre. Publisher: Josef Zindel im Friedrich Reinhardt Verlag, Basel. ISBN 978-3-7245-2305-5
- FCB team 1923–24 at fcb-archiv.ch
- Switzerland 1923-24 at RSSSF
