= 1913–14 FC Basel season =

FC Basel
1913–14 season
- Chairman: Karl Ibach until 25 September 1913; Carl Albert Hintermann from 25 September 1913
- First team coach: Percy Humphreys
- Ground: Landhof, Basel
- Serie A: Group Stage: 2nd
- Top goalscorer: Christian Albicker (12)

The FC Basel 1913–14 season was their twenty-first season since the club's foundation on 15 November 1893. The club's chairman was Karl Ibach, but he stood down at the AGM on 25 September 1913. From that date Carl Albert Hintermann took over as club president. FC Basel played their home games in the Landhof in the district Basel-Wettstein in Kleinbasel, Basel.

== Overview ==
The Englishman Percy Humphreys was the first professional trainer that the club FC Basel had ever employed. Under club chairman Karl Ibach, Humphreys signed his contract and began his duties on 1 April 1913. He had previously been head-coach for Hartlepool United in the English North Eastern League. Prior to Humphreys, it had always been the team captain who had taken over the function of the trainer.

Basel played 32 matches in their 1913–14 season. 14 of these matches were in the domestic league and 18 were friendly games. Six of these were home games, played in the Landhof, one other home game was played on the Margarethenwiese in Basel, five others were away games in Switzerland and five games were played abroad. Basel played seven matches against German teams, one against the English team Bradford City and the other ten opponents were Swiss. Of these friendlies 10 were won and 8 ended with a defeat. In these 18 games Basel scored a total of 57 goals and conceded 47.

The Swiss Serie A 1913–14 was divided into three regional groups, East, Central and West. Basel were allocated to the Central group together with local rivals Old Boys and Nordstern Basel. The other teams playing in the Central group were Young Boys, FC La Chaux-de-Fonds, Étoile-Sporting FC La Chaux-de-Fonds, FC Bern and Biel-Bienne. Basel started well into the championship winning seven of the first eight games, the first four games straight off. After the new year break things turned against them and they were defeated three times. Basel lost contact to the Young Boys at the top of the table and ended the season in joint second position with FC Bern, they were three points behind the group winners. In their 14 games Basel scored 63 goals and conceded 33. The two highest scoring games were both played against FC La Chaux-de-Fonds. Basel won the home game 11–4 and the away game 10–1.

The Young Boys continued to the finals against Cantonal Neuchatel and Aarau, who eventually won the championship in the Finals. Last place in the group bottom was Old Boys, who therefore entered the play-off round against relegation, in which they were successful.

The Anglo-Cup was not played in this year and so, Basel could not defend the title that they had obtained the year before. But memories of this cup win soon faded anyway, because in fact the competition was discontinued completely due to World War I.

== Players ==
Squad members

Note: Flags indicate national team as defined under FIFA eligibility rules; some limited exceptions apply. Players may hold more than one non-FIFA nationality.

No.	Pos.	Nation	Player
—	GK	SUI	Fridolin Wenger
—	DF	SUI	Paul Bettex
—	DF	SUI	Hermann Moll
—	DF	SUI	Peter Riesterer
—	MF	SUI	Fritz Albicker (II)
—	MF	SUI	Wilhelm 'Willy' Geisser
—	MF	GER	Josef Goldschmidt
—	MF	SUI	Ernst Gossweiler
—	MF	SUI	Emil Hasler
—	MF	SUI	Ernst Kaltenbach
—	MF	SUI	Otto Kuhn
—	MF	SUI	Emil Schreyer
—	FW	SUI	Fritz Aeppli

No.	Pos.	Nation	Player
—	FW	SUI	Christian Albicker (I)
—	FW		Rudolf Bredschneider
—	FW	ENG	Percy Humphreys
—	FW		Carl Schloz
—	FW	SUI	Karl Wunderle
—			Roger Breithaupt
—			Walter Flück
—			Max Glenck
—	GK		Emil Fehr
—	GK		Camillo Persenico
—	GK		Schaltenbrand
—			? Gossweiler
—			? Hack
—			? Rittel

== Results ==
Legend

Win Draw Loss

=== Friendly matches ===
==== Pre- and mid-season ====
24 August 1913 Pre-season	Freiburger FC	2–4	Basel	Feldberg
	Goal	Summary	Goal

30 August 1913 Pre-season	Basel	2–0	Stuttgarter Kickers	Landhof, Basel
	Schreyer; Albicker	Summary		Referee: (Switzerland) Louis Riesterer

14 September 1913 Pre-season	St. Gallen	3–2	Basel	St. Gallen
	Leissing (1:1); Neumeyer (2:1); Ehrbar (pen. 3:1)	Summary	(0:1) (3:2) Humphreys

28 September 1913 Pre-season	Servette	0–4	Basel	Parc des Sports, Geneva
14:30		Summary	Goal

16 November 1913 Mid-season	Basel	3–0	Freiburger FC	Landhof, Basel
15:00	Goal	Summary

==== Winter break to end of season ====
14 December 1913 Winter break	Equipe Romande Basel	1–6	Basel	Basel
	Goal	Summary	Goal

26 December 1913 Winter break	Karlsruher FV	4–7	Basel	Karlsruhe
	(1:2) (2:2) (pen. 3:3); Fuchs (4:4)	Summary	3' (0:1) (0:2) (2:3) (3:4) Aeppli (4:5) Aeppli (4:6) (4:7)

11 January 1914 Mid-season	Freiburger FC	3–6	Basel	Freiburg im Breisgau
	Diemer; Walch; Nägele	Summary	Goal	Referee: (Germany) Ehret (Germany) H. Banzhaf

1 February 1914 Mid-season	Baden	4–5	Basel	Baden
	Goal	Summary	Goal	Attendance: 300

8 March 1914 Mid-season	Basel	2–3	Concordia Basel	Landhof, Basel
10:30	Moll 30' (pen. 1:0); Moll 75' (pen. 2:1)	Summary	(1:1) Schürch (pen. 2:2) Ferralli II; 90' Ferralli II

5 April 1914 Mid-season	Basel	0–5	Cantonal	Landhof, Basel
		Summary	10' (0:1) (0:2); 30' (0:3); 85' (0:4); 90' (0:5)

11 April 1914 Mid-season	MTV München 1879	6–1	Basel	Munich
	Goal	Summary	Goal

12 April 1914 Mid-season	Bayern Munich	4–1	Basel	Munich
	Goal	Summary	Goal

26 April 1914 Mid-season	Young Fellows Zürich	3–0	Basel	Hardturm, Zürich
	Schaltenbrand; Wintsch; Schaltenbrand	Summary		Attendance: 1,500

10 May 1911 End of season	Basel	2–4	Bradford City	Landhof, Basel
15:10	Bredschneider 76' (1:4); Albicker 78' (2:4)	Summary	10' (0:1) Slaer; 20' (0:2) Bond; 63' (0:3) Currie; 70' (o.g. 0:4) Goldschmidt	Attendance: 3,500; Referee: (Switzerland) Louis Riesterer

17 May 1914 End of season	Basel	7–0	Baden	Landhof, Basel
	Schreyer (1:0) (2:0); Aeppli (3:0) (4:0); Aeppli (5:0); Hasler (6:0); 80' (7:0)	Summary

24 May 1914 End of season	Cantonal	2–5	Basel	Colombier, Neuchâtel
	Goal	Summary	Goal

7 June 1914 End of season	Basel	0–3	Young Fellows Zürich	Margarethenwiese, Basel
17:00		(Switzerland) Summary	(0:1) Schaltenbrand (0:2) Schaltenbrand (0:3) Leiber II

=== Serie A ===
==== Central group results ====
5 October 1913 Round 1	Basel	11–4	La Chaux-de-Fonds	Landhof, Basel
15:00	(1:3) (2:3) (3:3) (4:3) (5:3) (6:3) (7:3) (8:3) (9:3) (10:3) (11:3)	Summary	(0:1) (0:2) (0:3) (pen. 11:4) Haudenschild	Referee: (Switzerland) Etzensberger Etoile La Chaux-de-Fonds

12 October 1913 Round 2	Biel-Bienne	2–4	Basel	Gurzelen Stadion, Biel/Bienne
14:45	Fallet 25' (1:1); Grupp 73' (2:3)	Summary	15' (0:1); 60' (1:2); 61' (1:3); 73' (2:4)	Referee: (Switzerland) Dondelinger

19 October 1913 Round 3	Étoile-Sporting	1–5	Basel	La Chaux-de-Fonds
14:35	Wyss (I) 35' (1:3)	Summary	4' (0:1) Albicker (I); 9' (0:2) Albicker (I); 25' (0:3) Albicker (I) (1:4) Schreyer (1:5) Aeppli	Referee: (Switzerland) Otto Eicher Young Boys

9 November 1913 Round 4	Nordstern Basel	5–7	Basel	Basel
15:00	Bollinger 11' (1:0); Wüthrich (2:2); Bollinger (pen. 3:4); Bollinger (4:7); Bollinger (5:7)	Summary	5' (1:1) Aeppli (1:2) Wunderle (2:3) Schreyer (2:4) Aeppli (3:5) Albicker (I); 51' (2:6) Schreyer (3:7) Aeppli	Referee: (Switzerland) H. Allemann Zürich

23 November 1913 Round 5	Basel	1–2	Young Boys	Landhof, Basel
14:30	Schreyer 61' (1:2)	Summary	15' (0:1) Funk (II); 42' (0:2) Bommer	Attendance: 2,000; Referee: (Switzerland) Willy Beuttner Zürich

30 November 1913 Round 6	Old Boys	2–7	Basel	Basel
15:00	Grunauer 29' (1:1); Higelin (pen. 2:7)	Summary	12' (0:1) Albicker (I); 35' (pen. 1:2) Moll; 43' Albicker (I); 48' (1:4) Aeppli; 50' (pen. 1:5) Albicker (I); 64' (1:6) Albicker (I) (1:7) Bredschneider	Attendance: 2,000; Referee: (Switzerland) H. Grisch Young Fellows Zürich

7 December 1913 Round 7	Basel	7–1	FC Bern	Landhof, Basel
15:00	Albicker (I) (1:0); Wunderle (2:0); Albicker (I) (pen. 3:0) (4:1) (5:1) (6:1) (7:1) Bredschneider	Summary	(3:1) Beuchat	Attendance: 1,400; Referee: (Switzerland) Allemann Zürich

4 January 1914 Round 8	Basel	4–1	Nordstern Basel	Landhof, Basel
14:30	Moll (pen. 1:0); Schreyer (2:0); Kaltenbach (3:0); Bredschneider (4:1)	Summary	(3:1) Haas	Attendance: 1,200; Referee: (Switzerland) H. Grisch Young Fellows Zürich

15 February 1914 Round 9	Young Boys	5–0	Basel	Bern
	Dasen 2' (1:0); Funk (II) 5' (2:0); Reber 15' (3:0); Dasen 40' (4:0); Dasen 80' (5:0)	Summary		Attendance: 3,000; Referee: (Switzerland) Sandoz Lausanne-Sport

22 February 1914 Round 10	Basel	2–4	Étoile-Sporting	Landhof, Basel
15:00	Albicker (I) (1:2); Albicker (I) (2:2)	Summary	10' (0:1) Perrenoud; 30' (0:2) Hirschi (2:3) Wyss (I) (2:4) Wyss (II)	Referee: (Switzerland) Hans Koblet Winterthur

1 March 1914 Round 11	Basel	2–1	Old Boys	Landhof, Basel
15:00	Wunderle 5' (1:0); Aeppli 27' (2:0)	Summary	49' (2:1) Merkt	Attendance: 2,500; Referee: (Switzerland) Weber St. Gallen

15 March 1914 Round 12	Basel	2–2	Biel-Bienne	Landhof, Basel
15:00	Moll (pen. 1:0); Kaltenbach (2:2)	Summary	(1:1) Lehmann (1:2) Keller	Referee: (Switzerland) Weber St. Gallen

22 March 1914 Round 13	FC Bern	2–0	Basel	Kirchenfeld, Bern
	(1:0); Wasserfallen (2:0)	Summary		Referee: (Switzerland)

3 May 1914 Round 14	La Chaux-de-Fonds	1–10	Basel	Parc des Sports, La Chaux-de-Fonds
14:30	Robert Vital (1:3)	Summary	5' (0:1) (0:2) (0:3) (1:4) (1:5) (1:6) (1:7) (1:8) (1:9) (1:10)	Referee: (Switzerland)

==== Central group league table ====
Pos	Team	Pld	W	D	L	GF	GA	GD	Pts	Qualification
1	Young Boys	14	10	2	2	46	21	+25	22	Advance to finals
2	Basel	14	9	1	4	63	33	+30	19	
3	FC Bern	14	9	1	4	40	32	+8	19	
4	Étoile-Sporting	14	7	1	6	34	34	0	15	
5	Biel-Bienne	14	5	2	7	33	34	−1	12	
6	Nordstern Basel	14	5	1	8	29	34	−5	11	
7	La Chaux-de-Fonds	14	3	2	9	26	57	−31	8	
8	Old Boys	14	2	2	10	21	47	−26	6	To relegation play-off

Source: rsssf

== See also ==
- History of FC Basel
- List of FC Basel players
- List of FC Basel seasons

== Sources ==
- Rotblau: Jahrbuch Saison 2014/2015. Publisher: FC Basel Marketing AG. ISBN 978-3-7245-2027-6
- Die ersten 125 Jahre. Publisher: Josef Zindel im Friedrich Reinhardt Verlag, Basel. ISBN 978-3-7245-2305-5
- FCB team 1913–14 at fcb-archiv.ch
- Switzerland 1913-14 at RSSSF
