= Fritz Schneider =

Fritz Schneider may refer to:

- Fritz Schneider (ski jumper) (born 1928), Swiss ski jumper
- Fritz Schneider (footballer), Swiss footballer

== See also ==
- Fritz Scheider, German water polo player
