= Arnold Hürzeler =

Swiss footballer

Personal information
- Full name: Arnold Hürzeler
- Place of birth: Switzerland
- Position: Striker

Senior career*
Years	Team	Apps	(Gls)
1925–1926	FC Basel	15	(8)
- * Club domestic league appearances and goals

Arnold Hürzeler was a Swiss footballer who played one season for FC Basel. He played as a striker.

Hürzeler joined Basel before the club's 1925–26 season started. He played a total of 23 games for the team, in which he scored 17 goals. 15 of these games were in the Swiss Serie A, two in the Swiss Cup and six were friendly games. He scored eight goals in the domestic league, seven in the cup and the other two goals were scored during the test games.

He played his first game for the club in the first game of the 1925–26 Serie A season on 6 September 1925 against Solothurn. He scored his first league goal for the club in the very next game on 13 September in the home game, at the Landhof, against Concordia Basel. In fact, he made it a hat-trick, because he scored Basel's second, fourth and sixth goals, as Basel won by seven goals to nil.

The very first Swiss Cup tournament was organised that season by the Swiss Football Association (and has been organised by them annually since then). In the first round Basel were drawn against lower tier FC Horgen and the game took place on 4 October 1925. Basel won their first cup match 8–1 and Hürzeler secured the safe victory for his team by scoring six of the eight goals.

In his first ten games for Basel Hürzeler netted 16 times. Unfortunately things turned around completely, because in his last ten games he did not score a single goal. After the season he left the club, destination unknown.

== Sources ==
- Rotblau: Jahrbuch Saison 2017/2018. Publisher: FC Basel Marketing AG. ISBN 978-3-7245-2189-1
- Die ersten 125 Jahre. Publisher: Josef Zindel im Friedrich Reinhardt Verlag, Basel. ISBN 978-3-7245-2305-5
- Verein "Basler Fussballarchiv" Homepage
