= Max Glenck =

Swiss footballer (born 1889)

Personal information
- Full name: Max Glenck
- Date of birth: 7 December 1889
- Positions: Goalkeeper; midfielder

Senior career*
Years	Team	Apps	(Gls)
1913–1914	FC Basel	2	(0)
- * Club domestic league appearances and goals

Max Glenck (born 7 December 1889) was a Swiss footballer who played for FC Basel. He played as a goalkeeper and as a midfielder.

Glenck joined Basel's first team for their 1913–14 season under Basel's very first professional coach, the English ex-international and professional player Percy Humphreys. Glenck played his domestic league debut for the club as the goalkeeper in the away game on 22 March 1914 when Basel were defeated 0–2 by FC Bern.

Glenck played one season for their first team and during this time he played two games for them in the Serie A. The second match he played as a midfielder, a positional change that was quite normal during this period of time.

== Sources ==
- Rotblau: Jahrbuch Saison 2017/2018. Publisher: FC Basel Marketing AG. ISBN 978-3-7245-2189-1
- Die ersten 125 Jahre. Publisher: Josef Zindel im Friedrich Reinhardt Verlag, Basel. ISBN 978-3-7245-2305-5
- Verein "Basler Fussballarchiv" Homepage

(NB: Despite all efforts, the editors of these books and the authors in "Basler Fussballarchiv" have failed to be able to identify all the players, their date and place of birth or date and place of death, who played in the games during the early years of FC Basel)
