= Carl Albert Hintermann =

Swiss footballer

Personal information
- Full name: Carl Albert Hintermann
- Date of birth: 2 November 1876
- Place of birth: Switzerland
- Date of death: c. 1945
- Place of death: Basel, Switzerland
- Positions: Defender; midfielder

Senior career*
Years	Team	Apps	(Gls)
1893–1896	FC Basel	0	(0)
- * Club domestic league appearances and goals

Carl Albert Hintermann (2 November 1876 – c. 1945) was a Swiss footballer who played for FC Basel. He played in the position as defender and as midfielder.

Between the years 1893 and 1896 Hintermann played a total of 4 games for Basel without scoring a goal. These games were friendly games. This Swiss domestic league was not founded until 1896.

He was also member of the FC Basel board of directors. He presided the club's board during the 1913–14 season. He took over as chairman following Karl Ibach and preceding Ernst-Alfred Thalmann's fifth presidential period.

== Sources and References ==
- Rotblau: Jahrbuch Saison 2017/2018. Publisher: FC Basel Marketing AG. ISBN 978-3-7245-2189-1
- Die ersten 125 Jahre. Publisher: Josef Zindel im Friedrich Reinhardt Verlag, Basel. ISBN 978-3-7245-2305-5
- Verein "Basler Fussballarchiv" Homepage
