= Eugen Haas =

Swiss footballer

Personal information
- Full name: Eugen Haas
- Place of birth: Switzerland
- Position: Forward

Senior career*
Years	Team	Apps	(Gls)
1923–1924	FC Basel	12	(0)
- * Club domestic league appearances and goals

Eugen Haas was a Swiss footballer who played for FC Basel in their 1923–24 season. He played as a forward.

In that season Haas played 18 games for Basel and scored twice; 12 of the games were in the Swiss Serie A and six were friendly games. He scored both his goals during the friendly games. Haas made his domestic league debut for the club in the away game on 30 September 1923 as Basel were defeated 2–1 by Nordstern Basel.

== Sources ==
- Rotblau: Jahrbuch Saison 2017/2018. Publisher: FC Basel Marketing AG. ISBN 978-3-7245-2189-1
- Die ersten 125 Jahre. Publisher: Josef Zindel im Friedrich Reinhardt Verlag, Basel. ISBN 978-3-7245-2305-5
- Verein "Basler Fussballarchiv" Homepage
