= Hans Vogt (footballer) =

Swiss footballer

Personal information
- Full name: Hans Vogt
- Place of birth: unknown
- Position: Midfielder

Senior career*
Years	Team	Apps	(Gls)
1923–1924	FC Basel	2	(0)
- * Club domestic league appearances and goals

Hans Vogt was a footballer who played for FC Basel. He played in the position of midfielder.

In the Basel season 1923–24 Hans Vogt played three games for FC Basel. Two of these games were in the Swiss Serie A and the other was a friendly game. He played his domestic league debut for the club in the away game on 3 February 1924 as Basel won 1–0 against Biel-Bienne.

== Sources ==
- Rotblau: Jahrbuch Saison 2017/2018. Publisher: FC Basel Marketing AG. ISBN 978-3-7245-2189-1
- Die ersten 125 Jahre. Publisher: Josef Zindel im Friedrich Reinhardt Verlag, Basel. ISBN 978-3-7245-2305-5
- Verein "Basler Fussballarchiv" Homepage
