= Jakob Bürgin =

Swiss footballer

Personal information
- Full name: Jakob Bürgin
- Place of birth: Switzerland
- Position: Defender

Senior career*
Years	Team	Apps	(Gls)
1927–1928	FC Basel	2	(0)
- * Club domestic league appearances and goals

Jakob Bürgin was a Swiss footballer who played for FC Basel in their season 1927–28 as a defender.

In that season Bürgin played a total of five games for Basel. Two of these games were in the Swiss Serie A, one in the Swiss Cup and two were friendly games. He played his league debut on 4 September 1927 in the away match against FC Bern.
