= Loïc Chatton =

Swiss footballer (born 1991)

Personal information
- Date of birth: 26 February 1991 (age 35)
- Place of birth: Biel/Bienne, Switzerland
- Height: 1.82 m (6 ft 0 in)
- Position: Forward

Team information
- Current team: Breitenrain (sport director)

Youth career
- –2008: Biel-Bienne

Senior career*
Years	Team	Apps	(Gls)
2008–2010	Biel-Bienne	56	(14)
2010–2013	Sion	31	(2)
2011	→ Lugano (loan)	9	(2)
2012	→ Biel-Bienne (loan)	8	(1)
2013–2016	Neuchâtel Xamax	57	(16)
2016–2022	Solothurn	122	(90)
2022	Biel-Bienne	14	(5)
2022–2023	Breitenrain	18	(1)
Total		315	(131)

International career
2010	Switzerland U19	8	(1)
2010–2012	Switzerland U20	8	(0)
- * Club domestic league appearances and goals

Loïc Chatton (born 26 February 1991 in Biel-Bienne) is a Sport Director and former Swiss professional footballer who played as a forward. He is actually committee member and sport director of the Breitenrain, in the Swiss Promotion League.

== Career ==
Chatton made his professional debut with FC Biel-Bienne's first team in October 2008 against FC Winterthur in the Swiss Challenge League with a 2–0 victory. His first game with the Switzerland national under-19 team was on 21 April 2010 against Italy.

On 31 October 2010, Chatton signed a five-year professional contract with FC Sion in the Swiss Super League. The club won the Swiss Cup on 29 May 2011 (2–0 against Neuchâtel Xamax). Although he played in all of the cup matches leading up to the final, he did not enter into the game on this 12th cup victory of the club.

In July 2013, Chatton decided to join Neuchâtel Xamax FCS in the Swiss 1. Liga, the Swiss fourth tier, with some others national league players and helped the club to return to the Swiss Challenge League in 2015 with two successive championships and promotions. In August 2015, he was operated after a knee injury (meniscus and cartilage) contracted after the first season game and made his comeback on the field on 16 April 2016 against FC Chiasso, after nine months without playing. With one goal in the last five games, he took part to the surprising second place of his team in the CHL.

After his adventure at Xamax and numerous knee problems, Chatton bounced back in the Swiss 1. Liga with FC Solothurn. As team captain, he scored 90 goals in 122 matches and led his team to the promotion playoffs three times, without ever managing to get past the final stage.

After a brief return to his former club FC Biel-Bienne, he ended his career in 2022 in the third division with his local club FC Breitenrain, before becoming sporting director and a member of the board, a position he still holds today.

== Honours ==
Sion

- Swiss Cup: 2011

Neuchâtel Xamax

- Swiss 1. Liga: 2014

Neuchâtel Xamax

- Swiss Promotion League: 2015

Neuchâtel Xamax

- Challenge League: 2016

FC Solothurn

- Top Scorer Swiss 1. Liga: 2018

FC Solothurn

- Top Scorer Swiss 1. Liga: 2021

FC Solothurn

- Top Scorer Swiss Cup: 2021
- Record 5km/h - 1:57km/h
