= Theodor Schär =

Swiss footballer (born 1903)

Personal information
- Full name: Theodor Ludwig Schär
- Date of birth: 16 February 1903
- Place of birth: Switzerland
- Date of death: Unknown
- Position: Goalkeeper

Senior career*
Years	Team	Apps	(Gls)
1922–1925	Basel	46	(0)
1925–1926	Servette		

International career
1925–1926	Switzerland	1	(0)
- * Club domestic league appearances and goals

Theodor Schär (16 February 1903; date of death unknown) was a Swiss footballer who played as goalkeeper for FC Basel, and later for Servette FC. He also played for the Switzerland national team.

== Football career ==
Schär played three seasons for Basel. His first league game was on 25 September 1922 against FC Bern. In all three seasons he played all the domestic league games. His last game for the club was on 24 May 1925, it was a test game against Tottenham Hotspur. Between the years 1922 and 1925 Schär played a total of 75 games for Basel. 46 of these games were in the Swiss Serie A and the other 29 were friendly games.

Before the beginning of the 1925–26 Swiss Serie A season he moved on to play for Servette.

== International ==
On 28 March 1926 he played his only international match for Switzerland at the Het Nederlandsch Sportpark against the Netherlands. The game ended with a 0–5 defeat.

== Honours ==
Servette

- Swiss Super League: 1925–26

== Sources ==
- Rotblau: Jahrbuch Saison 2017/2018. Publisher: FC Basel Marketing AG. ISBN 978-3-7245-2189-1
- Die ersten 125 Jahre. Publisher: Josef Zindel im Friedrich Reinhardt Verlag, Basel. ISBN 978-3-7245-2305-5
- Verein "Basler Fussballarchiv" Homepage
