= Max Oswald =

Swiss footballer (born 1906)

Personal information
- Full name: Max Oswald
- Date of birth: 14 April 1906
- Place of birth: Switzerland
- Position: Forward

Senior career*
Years	Team	Apps	(Gls)
1926–1929	FC Basel	11	(3)
- * Club domestic league appearances and goals

Max Oswald (14 April 1906 – after 1928) was a Swiss footballer who played for FC Basel during the late 1920s. He played as a forward.

Oswald joined Basel's first team in 1926. During his first season, he played in only one league match and in one friendly game. He played his domestic league debut for the club in the home game at the Landhof on 14 May 1927 as Basel won 1–0 against Concordia Basel. He scored his first goal for his club during the 1927–28 Serie A season on 19 February 1928 in the home game against Solothurn as Basel won 4–0.

Between 1926 and 1929 Oswald played 24 games for Basel scoring four goals; 11 of these games were in the Swiss Serie A, 1 in the Swiss Cup and 12 were friendly games. He scored three goals in the domestic league, the other was scored during the test games.

== Sources ==
- Rotblau: Jahrbuch Saison 2017/2018. Publisher: FC Basel Marketing AG. ISBN 978-3-7245-2189-1
- Die ersten 125 Jahre. Publisher: Josef Zindel im Friedrich Reinhardt Verlag, Basel. ISBN 978-3-7245-2305-5
- Verein "Basler Fussballarchiv" Homepage
