= Maxime Lehmann =

French footballer (1906-2009)

Personal information
- Full name: Maxime Robert Lehmann
- Date of birth: 17 December 1906
- Place of birth: Basel, Switzerland
- Date of death: 24 April 2009 (aged 102)
- Place of death: Riehen, Switzerland
- Height: 1.76 m (5 ft 9 in)
- Position: Defensive midfielder

Senior career*
Years	Team	Apps	(Gls)
1922–1926	FC Concordia Basel	16+	(5+)
1926–1928	FC Basel	15	(0)
1928–1929	Stade Français	4+	(1+)
1929–1938	FC Sochaux	184+	(4+)
1939–1944	FC Bienne	55	(0)

International career
1935–1936	France	2	(0)
- * Club domestic league appearances and goals

Maxime Robert Lehmann (17 December 1906 – 24 April 2009) was a footballer who played in the late 1920s, the 1930s and the early 1940s as defensive midfielder. Born in Switzerland, he represented France internationally.

== Biography ==
Born in Basel, Lehmann played his youth football with FC Concordia Basel and advanced to their first team in 1922, remaining with them until 1926, when he switched across town to FC Basel.

During his first season, 1926–27, with Basel Lehmann played four friendly matches. In the end of season friendly match on 5 June 1927 he scored two goals as Basel won 3–1 against local team Black Stars Basel. Lehmann played his domestic league debut for the club during the next season. This was an away match on 4 September 1927 as Basel lost 2–3 against FC Bern. During his two seasons at the club Lehmann played a total of 24 games for Basel, scoring those two aforementioned goals. Fifteen of these games were in the Swiss Serie A, one was in the Swiss Cup, and eight were friendly games.

Following his time in Basel, Lehmann moved to Paris, where he spent one season with Stade Français before joining FC Sochaux in 1929, where he would remain until 1938. With them, he was twice French Division 1 Champion (1935, 1938) and won the 1937 Coupe de France. He also played in two international matches with the France national football team: a 2–0 loss against Spain and a 3–0 victory against Belgium. As the Second World War broke out, Lehmann returned to Switzerland and joined FC Biel-Bienne. He spent the remainder of his active football career with them and played 51 league matches in five years, before retiring in 1944.

== Sources ==
- Rotblau: Jahrbuch Saison 2017/2018. Publisher: FC Basel Marketing AG. ISBN 978-3-7245-2189-1
- Die ersten 125 Jahre. Publisher: Josef Zindel im Friedrich Reinhardt Verlag, Basel. ISBN 978-3-7245-2305-5
- Verein "Basler Fussballarchiv" Homepage
