= Heinrich Hess (footballer) =

Swiss footballer

Personal information
- Full name: Heinrich Hess
- Place of birth: Switzerland
- Position: Forward

Senior career*
Years	Team	Apps	(Gls)
1923–1925	FC Basel	20	(2)
- * Club domestic league appearances and goals

Heinrich Hess was a Swiss footballer who played for FC Basel. He played mainly as a forward.

== Football career ==
During his first season with Basel Hess played in two friendlies before making his domestic league debut on 28 September 1923 against Young Boys. He scored his first goal for his club during his next match on 11 November 1923 at home in the Landhof against Biel-Bienne and Basel won the game 1–0. He played his last game for the club on 5 April 1925 in the goalless draw against Young Boys.

Between 1923 and 1925 Hess played 28 games for Basel and scored eight goals; 20 games were in the Swiss Serie A and 8 were friendlies. He scored two goals in the domestic league and six in friendlies.

== Sources ==
- Rotblau: Jahrbuch Saison 2017/2018. Publisher: FC Basel Marketing AG. ISBN 978-3-7245-2189-1
- Die ersten 125 Jahre. Publisher: Josef Zindel im Friedrich Reinhardt Verlag, Basel. ISBN 978-3-7245-2305-5
- Verein "Basler Fussballarchiv" Homepage
