= 1923–24 Swiss Serie A =

Swiss football season

Swiss Serie A
- Season: 1923–24

Statistics of Swiss Super League in the 1923–24 season.

== East ==
=== Table ===
Pos	Team	Pld	W	D	L	GF	GA	GD	Pts
1	FC Zürich	16	13	0	3	52	12	+40	26
2	Young Fellows Zürich	16	12	2	2	44	23	+21	26
3	Grasshopper Club Zürich	16	8	3	5	30	34	−4	19
4	FC St. Gallen	16	8	2	6	37	20	+17	18
5	Brühl St. Gallen	16	6	2	8	24	31	−7	14
6	FC Winterthur	16	5	2	9	18	22	−4	12
7	Sportclub Veltheim	16	6	0	10	33	51	−18	12
8	FC Lugano	16	4	2	10	21	35	−14	10
9	Blue Stars Zürich	16	3	1	12	19	50	−31	7

Source: rsssf.com

=== Results ===
Home \ Away	BSZ	BRÜ	GCZ	LUG	STG	VEL	WIN	YFZ	ZÜR
Blue Stars Zürich		3–2	3–1	3–1	1–2	1–3	0–2	2–3	0–5
Brühl	6–0		2–3	2–0	0–0	0–3	2–0	1–3	0–1
Grasshopper	2–1	1–2		2–1	3–1	4–2	3–2	1–1	2–1
Lugano	4–1	5–1	0–0		1–0	5–2	0–0	1–3	0–3
St. Gallen	3–0	1–1	7–0	4–0		5–1	2–1	0–3	2–3
Veltheim	3–1	1–3	5–2	4–2	2–7		3–1	2–3	1–7
Winterthur	1–1	0–1	0–2	4–0	1–0	3–0		1–0	0–2
Young Fellows	5–1	5–1	3–3	3–2	2–1	4–1	4–2		1–4
Zürich	8–2	5–0	3–1	4–0	1–2	3–0	2–0	0–1	

Legend: Blue = home team win; Yellow = draw; Red = away team win.

== Central ==
=== Table ===
Pos	Team	Pld	W	D	L	GF	GA	GD	Pts
1	Nordstern Basel	16	11	4	1	34	10	+24	26
2	Young Boys Bern	16	10	5	1	28	9	+19	25
3	FC Basel	16	8	2	6	16	15	+1	18
4	Old Boys Basel	16	6	5	5	29	26	+3	17
5	FC Bern	16	4	6	6	25	31	−6	14
6	FC Aarau	16	4	4	8	14	20	−6	12
7	FC Concordia Basel	16	4	3	9	19	31	−12	11
8	FC Lucerne	16	4	3	9	13	30	−17	11
9	FC Biel Bienne	16	3	4	9	13	19	−6	10

Source: rsssf.com

=== Results ===
Home \ Away	AAR	BAS	BER	BIE	CON	LUZ	NOR	OBB	YB
Aarau		1–0	3–0	1–1	0–0	0–2	0–1	0–3	1–0
Basel	2–0		2–1	1–0	0–1	2–2	1–0	2–0	0–0
Bern	1–1	3–1		1–1	5–3	3–1	2–2	0–0	0–4
Biel	0–0	0–1	1–2		4–0	1–0	0–1	1–2	1–2
Concordia	2–1	0–1	4–3	3–0		0–1	1–6	2–2	0–2
Luzern	0–4	0–1	0–0	0–0	2–0		1–6	3–0	0–2
Nordstern	2–1	2–1	4–1	1–0	5–2	4–0		0–0	0–0
Old Boys	3–0	4–1	2–2	2–3	3–1	5–1	0–4		1–4
Young Boys	3–1	1–0	2–1	2–0	1–1	2–0	1–1	2–2	

Legend: Blue = home team win; Yellow = draw; Red = away team win.

== West ==
=== Table ===
Pos	Team	Pld	W	D	L	GF	GA	GD	Pts
1	Servette Genf	16	14	2	0	42	9	+33	30
2	FC La Chaux-de-Fonds	16	11	0	5	42	18	+24	22
3	Etoile La Chaux-de-Fonds	16	9	4	3	34	16	+18	22
4	Lausanne Sports	16	6	4	6	24	28	−4	16
5	Urania Geneve Sports	16	6	3	7	22	25	−3	15
6	Cantonal Neuchatel	16	7	0	9	22	26	−4	14
7	Etoile Carouge	16	6	1	9	16	38	−22	13
8	FC Fribourg	16	2	2	12	14	36	−22	6
9	Montreux Sports	16	1	4	11	17	37	−20	6

Source: rsssf.com

== Results ==
Home \ Away	CAN	CDF	ÉTC	ÉTS	FRI	LS	MON	SER	UGS
Cantonal Neuchâtel		1–3	0–1	2–3	2–1	1–2	3–2	0–5	1–2
Chaux-de-Fonds	3–1		6–1	1–0	3–0	1–2	2–0	1–3	4–1
Étoile Carouge	1–3	0–3		0–2	2–0	1–2	3–2	0–3	0–0
Étoile-Sporting	6–0	1–0	6–0		2–1	7–2	3–3	0–1	1–1
Fribourg	0–1	0–7	1–3	1–1		3–0	3–2	1–1	2–3
Lausanne-Sports	0–2	3–1	5–0	1–1	2–1		2–2	1–1	1–1
Montreux-Sports	0–4	1–3	0–1	1–3	0–0	1–0		1–1	0–2
Servette	1–0	3–2	5–2	2–1	5–0	3–0	1–0		2–1
Urania	0–1	1–2	0–1	1–2	1–0	2–1	6–2	0–5	

Legend: Blue = home team win; Yellow = draw; Red = away team win.

== Final ==
=== Table ===
Pos	Team	Pld	W	D	L	GF	GA	GD	Pts
1	FC Zürich	2	2	0	0	4	1	+3	4
2	Nordstern Basel	2	1	0	1	2	3	−1	2
3	Servette Genf	2	0	0	2	0	2	−2	0

Source: rsssf.com

=== Results ===
Team 1	Score	Team 2
13 April 1924
Nordstern Basel	1–0	Servette
4 May 1924
Zürich	1–0	Servette
11 May 1924
Zürich	3–1	Nordstern Basel

FC Zürich won the championship.

== Sources ==
- Switzerland 1923-24 at RSSSF
