= Arnold Wyssling =

Swiss footballer

Personal information
- Full name: Arnold Wyssling
- Place of birth: Switzerland
- Position: Goalkeeper

Senior career*
Years	Team	Apps	(Gls)
1923–1926	FC Basel	2	(0)
- * Club domestic league appearances and goals

Arnold Wyssling was a Swiss footballer who played for FC Basel in the 1920's. He played as goalkeeper.

Wyssling joined FC Basel's first team in 1923. Between the years 1923 and 1926 Wyssling played a total of four first team games for the club. Two of these games were in the Swiss Serie A and two were friendly games. In his first two seasons he played only in two test matches. He played his debut for the club in the first game of the 1925–26 Serie A season on 6 September 1925 against Solothurn.

== Sources ==
- Rotblau: Jahrbuch Saison 2017/2018. Publisher: FC Basel Marketing AG. ISBN 978-3-7245-2189-1
- Die ersten 125 Jahre. Publisher: Josef Zindel im Friedrich Reinhardt Verlag, Basel. ISBN 978-3-7245-2305-5
- Verein "Basler Fussballarchiv" Homepage
