= 1913–14 Swiss Serie A =

Swiss football season

Swiss Serie A
- Season: 1913–14

Statistics of Swiss Super League in the 1913–14 season.

== East ==
=== Table ===
Pos	Team	Pld	W	D	L	GF	GA	GD	Pts
1	FC Aarau	14	11	2	1	55	14	+41	24
2	FC St. Gallen	14	8	3	3	30	22	+8	19
3	FC Winterthur	14	5	5	4	36	26	+10	15
4	FC Zürich	14	7	1	6	32	31	+1	15
5	Blue Stars Zürich	14	5	3	6	31	37	−6	13
6	Brühl St. Gallen	14	4	5	5	27	35	−8	13
7	Young Fellows Zürich	14	3	2	9	25	36	−11	8
8	FC Baden	14	1	3	10	21	56	−35	5

Source: rsssf

== Central ==
=== Table ===
Pos	Team	Pld	W	D	L	GF	GA	GD	Pts
1	Young Boys Bern	14	10	2	2	46	21	+25	22
2	FC Basel	14	9	1	4	63	33	+30	19
3	FC Bern	14	9	1	4	40	32	+8	19
4	Etoile La Chaux-de-Fonds	14	7	1	6	34	34	0	15
5	FC Biel Bienne	14	5	2	7	33	34	−1	12
6	Nordstern Basel	14	5	1	8	29	34	−5	11
7	FC La Chaux-de-Fonds	14	3	2	9	26	57	−31	8
8	Old Boys Basel	14	2	2	10	21	47	−26	6

Source: rsssf

== West ==
=== Table ===
Pos	Team	Pld	W	D	L	GF	GA	GD	Pts
1	Cantonal Neuchatel	12	11	1	0	52	15	+37	23
2	Lausanne Sports	12	8	2	2	51	15	+36	18
3	Servette Genf	12	8	0	4	54	25	+29	16
4	Stella Fribourg	12	6	1	5	30	30	0	13
5	FC Genf	12	4	0	8	20	42	−22	8
6	Montreux Narcisse	12	3	0	9	24	44	−20	6
7	Concordia Yverdon	12	0	0	12	8	68	−60	0

Source: rsssf

== Final ==
=== Table ===
Pos	Team	Pld	W	D	L	GF	GA	GD	Pts
1	FC Aarau	2	1	1	0	3	2	+1	3
2	Young Boys Bern	2	1	0	1	5	5	0	2
3	Cantonal Neuchatel	2	0	1	1	4	5	−1	1

Source: rsssf

=== Results ===
Team 1	Score	Team 2
26 April 1914
Aarau	1–1	Cantonal Neuchâtel
3 May 1914
Young Boys	4–3	Cantonal Neuchâtel
10 May 1914
Aarau	2–1	Young Boys

FC Aarau won the championship.

== Sources ==
- Switzerland 1913-14 at RSSSF
