= Gottlieb Häusselmann =

Swiss footballer

Personal information
- Full name: Gottlieb Häusselmann
- Place of birth: Switzerland
- Position: Forward

Senior career*
Years	Team	Apps	(Gls)
1921–1924	FC Basel	2	(0)
- * Club domestic league appearances and goals

Gottlieb Häusselmann was a Swiss footballer who played for FC Basel as a forward.

Häusselmann joined Basel's first team in 1921. In his first season he played only one test match. He made his domestic league debut for the club in the away game on 30 September 1923 as Basel were defeated 2–1 by Nordstern Basel.

Between 1921 and 1924 Häusselmann played three games for Basel, two in the Swiss Serie A and one friendly game.

== Sources ==
- Rotblau: Jahrbuch Saison 2017/2018. Publisher: FC Basel Marketing AG. ISBN 978-3-7245-2189-1
- Die ersten 125 Jahre. Publisher: Josef Zindel im Friedrich Reinhardt Verlag, Basel. ISBN 978-3-7245-2305-5
- Verein "Basler Fussballarchiv" Homepage
