= Georg Heimann =

Swiss footballer (1905-1980)

Personal information
- Full name: Georg Heimann
- Date of birth: 29 May 1905
- Date of death: 1980 (aged 74–75)
- Position: Midfielder

Senior career*
Years	Team	Apps	(Gls)
1924–1929	FC Basel	11	(0)
- * Club domestic league appearances and goals

Georg Heimann (29 May 1905 – 1980) was a Swiss footballer who played for FC Basel. He played as midfielder.

Heimann joined Basel 1924, but in his first season he played only in four test games. He played his debut for the club in the first game of the 1925–26 Serie A season on 6 September 1925 against Solothurn. Between the years 1924 and 1929 Heimann played a total of 28 games for Basel without scoring a goal. 11 of these games were in the Swiss Serie A, one in the Swiss Cup and 16 were friendly games.

== Sources ==
- Rotblau: Jahrbuch Saison 2017/2018. Publisher: FC Basel Marketing AG. ISBN 978-3-7245-2189-1
- Die ersten 125 Jahre. Publisher: Josef Zindel im Friedrich Reinhardt Verlag, Basel. ISBN 978-3-7245-2305-5
- Verein "Basler Fussballarchiv" Homepage
