= Fritz Aeppli =

Swiss footballer

Personal information
- Full name: Fritz Aeppli
- Position: Forward

Senior career*
Years	Team	Apps	(Gls)
1912–1916	FC Basel	17	(6)
- * Club domestic league appearances and goals

Fritz Aeppli was a Swiss footballer who played for FC Basel. He played mainly in the position of forward.

Between the years 1912 and 1916 Aeppli played a total of 24 games for Basel scoring a total of 11 goals; 17 of these games were in the Swiss Serie A, one in the Anglo-Cup and six were friendly games. He scored six goal in the domestic league, the others were scored during the test games.

In the 1912–13 season Basel won the Anglo-Cup. Bredscheider was part of the team that won the final on 29 June 1913 in the Hardau Stadium, Zürich against FC Weissenbühl Bern 5–0.

== Bibliography ==
- Rotblau: Jahrbuch Saison 2017/2018. Publisher: FC Basel Marketing AG. ISBN 978-3-7245-2189-1
