= Rudolf Bredschneider =

Swiss footballer

Personal information
- Full name: Rudolf Bredschneider
- Positions: Forward; midfielder

Senior career*
Years	Team	Apps	(Gls)
1908–1919	FC Basel	46	(6)
- * Club domestic league appearances and goals

Rudolf Bredschneider was a Swiss footballer who played for FC Basel. He played mainly in the position as forward, but also as midfielder.

Between the years 1908 and 1919 Bredscheider played a total of 68 games for Basel, scoring a total of eight goals. 48 of these games were in the Swiss Serie A, three in the Anglo-Cup and 17 were friendly games. He scored six goals in the domestic league, the other two were scored during the test games.

In the 1912–13 season Basel won the Anglo-Cup. Bredscheider was part of the team that won the final on 29 June 1913 in the Hardau Stadium, Zürich against FC Weissenbühl Bern 5–0.

== Sources and References ==
- Rotblau: Jahrbuch Saison 2017/2018. Publisher: FC Basel Marketing AG. ISBN 978-3-7245-2189-1
