= 1927–28 Swiss Serie A =

31st season of top-tier Swiss football

Swiss Serie A
- Season: 1927–28

Statistics of Swiss Super League in the 1927–28 season.

== East ==
=== Table ===
Pos	Team	Pld	W	D	L	GF	GA	GD	Pts
1	Grasshopper Club Zürich	16	13	2	1	57	22	+35	28
2	Young Fellows Zürich	16	11	2	3	40	20	+20	24
3	FC Lugano	16	8	3	5	47	36	+11	19
4	Blue Stars Zürich	16	6	4	6	40	43	−3	16
5	FC Zürich	16	6	3	7	43	42	+1	15
6	FC Chiasso	16	4	4	8	29	41	−12	12
7	FC St. Gallen	16	3	4	9	27	38	−11	10
7	Brühl St. Gallen	16	3	4	9	26	47	−21	10
7	FC Winterthur	16	5	0	11	26	46	−20	10

Source: rsssf.com

=== Results ===
Home \ Away	BSZ	BRÜ	CHI	GCZ	LUG	STG	WIN	YFZ	ZÜR
Blue Stars Zürich		3–3	0–2	2–3	3–3	2–2	1–0	3–1	2–4
Brühl	0–4		2–2	0–1	3–1	2–2	5–3	2–3	3–5
Chiasso	0–4	4–0		2–5	0–3	2–1	3–4	1–2	3–3
Grasshopper	2–2	5–1	3–1		6–3	4–2	6–1	2–1	9–2
Lugano	4–2	8–0	3–3	2–3		1–1	4–2	1–5	2–1
St. Gallen	2–4	4–3	3–1	0–3	1–3		1–3	1–2	4–2
Winterthur	3–0	0–1	0–2	2–0	3–7	2–1		0–2	1–4
Young Fellows	6–1	2–1	2–2	1–1	3–1	2–0	0–1		4–1
Zürich	7–1	0–0	6–1	0–4	0–1	2–2	3–1	2–4	

Legend: Blue = home team win; Yellow = draw; Red = away team win.

== Central ==
=== Table ===
Pos	Team	Pld	W	D	L	GF	GA	GD	Pts
1	Nordstern Basel	16	10	3	3	40	11	+29	23
2	BSC Young Boys	16	9	4	3	34	10	+24	22
3	FC Basel	16	10	1	5	27	21	+6	21
4	FC Aarau	16	8	4	4	27	19	+8	20
5	FC Bern	16	7	3	6	32	22	+10	17
6	FC Grenchen	16	5	3	8	20	33	−13	13
7	FC Concordia Basel	16	5	1	10	26	38	−12	11
8	BSC Old Boys Basel	16	4	2	10	15	40	−25	10
9	FC Solothurn	16	2	3	11	16	43	−27	7

Source: rsssf.com

=== Results ===
Home \ Away	AAR	BAS	BER	CON	GRE	NOR	OBB	SOL	YB
Aarau		2–0	2–3	4–2	0–0	1–0	2–0	3–1	2–0
Basel	3–1		1–2	2–1	2–1	1–0	2–0	4–0	0–5
Bern	2–2	3–2		5–0	4–1	0–1	4–0	1–0	1–2
Concordia	0–2	0–1	3–2		3–0	0–4	2–0	8–2	2–7
Grenchen	3–2	3–2	2–2	3–2		0–0	1–2	1–2	1–0
Nordstern	1–1	0–1	2–1	1–0	8–0		2–0	7–3	1–1
Old Boys	1–1	2–3	2–1	1–2	1–4	0–5		5–3	0–0
Solothurn	1–2	1–3	1–1	0–0	1–0	1–5	0–1		0–2
Young Boys	1–0	0–0	1–0	4–0	2–0	1–3	8–0	0–0	

Legend: Blue = home team win; Yellow = draw; Red = away team win.

== West ==
=== Table ===
Pos	Team	Pld	W	D	L	GF	GA	GD	Pts
1	Etoile Carouge	16	13	1	2	41	15	+26	27
2	Servette Genf	16	10	0	6	52	26	+26	20
2	FC Biel Bienne	16	8	4	4	31	22	+9	20
4	Etoile La Chaux-de-Fonds	16	6	5	5	30	28	+2	17
5	Lausanne Sports	16	5	3	8	32	36	−4	13
5	FC La Chaux-de-Fonds	16	5	3	8	19	32	−13	13
7	FC Fribourg	16	5	2	9	22	36	−14	12
7	Urania Geneve Sport	16	5	2	9	19	33	−14	12
9	Cantonal Neuchâtel	16	3	4	9	14	32	−18	10

Source: rsssf.com

=== Results ===
Home \ Away	BIE	CAN	CDF	ÉTC	ÉTS	FRI	LS	SER	UGS
Biel		2–1	3–1	1–2	1–1	6–1	1–0	3–2	2–1
Cantonal Neuchâtel	2–2		2–0	1–3	2–2	0–3	1–1	1–0	1–0
Chaux-de-Fonds	0–0	2–0		1–1	2–1	2–1	1–5	2–3	2–2
Étoile Carouge	0–2	3–1	2–1		2–3	4–3	4–1	2–0	5–1
Étoile-Sporting	4–3	4–2	2–0	0–1		1–3	3–1	4–2	0–1
Fribourg	1–0	1–0	0–1	0–5	1–1		2–4	0–2	3–1
Lausanne-Sports	2–3	0–0	0–1	0–4	2–2	7–2		1–2	3–0
Servette	3–1	7–0	6–2	0–1	4–0	1–3	10–4		5–0
Urania	1–1	2–0	4–1	0–2	3–2	1–0	0–1	2–5	

Legend: Blue = home team win; Yellow = draw; Red = away team win.

== Final ==
=== Table ===
Pos	Team	Pld	W	D	L	GF	GA	GD	Pts
1	Grasshopper Club Zürich	2	2	0	0	6	2	+4	4
2	Nordstern Basel	2	1	0	1	3	3	0	2
3	Etoile Carouge	2	0	0	2	2	6	−4	0

Source: rsssf.com

=== Results ===
Team 1	Score	Team 2
22 April 1928
Nordstern	2–1	Étoile Carouge
29 April 1928
Grasshopper	4–1	Étoile Carouge
13 May 1928
Grasshopper	2–1	Nordstern

Grasshopper Club Zürich won the championship.

== Sources ==
- Switzerland 1927-28 at RSSSF
