= Fritz Bölle =

Swiss footballer

Personal information
- Full name: Fritz Bölle
- Place of birth: Switzerland
- Position: Forward

Senior career*
Years	Team	Apps	(Gls)
1925–1927	FC Basel	5	(1)
- * Club domestic league appearances and goals

Fritz Bölle was a Swiss footballer who played for FC Basel in the mid-1920s. He played as a forward.

In the two seasons 1925–26 and 1926–27 Bölle played eight games for Basel – five in the Swiss Serie A, one in the Swiss Cup and two friendlies – and scoring once. He made his debut in the first game of the 1925–26 Serie A season on 6 September 1925 against Solothurn. He scored his only goal in the next game on 13 September in the home game at the Landhof as Basel beat Concordia Basel 7–0.

== Sources ==
- Rotblau: Jahrbuch Saison 2017/2018. Publisher: FC Basel Marketing AG. ISBN 978-3-7245-2189-1
- Die ersten 125 Jahre. Publisher: Josef Zindel im Friedrich Reinhardt Verlag, Basel. ISBN 978-3-7245-2305-5
- Verein "Basler Fussballarchiv" Homepage
