= Emil Fehr =

Swiss association football player

Personal information
- Full name: Emil Fehr
- Position: Goalkeeper

Senior career*
Years	Team	Apps	(Gls)
1913–1919	FC Basel	5	(0)
- * Club domestic league appearances and goals

Emil Fehr was a Swiss footballer who played for FC Basel as a goalkeeper.

== Football career ==
Between the years 1913 and 1919 Fehr played a total of 8 games for Basel. Five of these games were in the Swiss Serie A and the other three were friendly games.

== Sources ==
- Rotblau: Jahrbuch Saison 2017/2018. Publisher: FC Basel Marketing AG. ISBN 978-3-7245-2189-1
- Die ersten 125 Jahre. Publisher: Josef Zindel im Friedrich Reinhardt Verlag, Basel. ISBN 978-3-7245-2305-5
- Verein "Basler Fussballarchiv" Homepage
