= Hans Streng =

Swiss footballer

Personal information
- Full name: Hans Streng
- Place of birth: Switzerland
- Position: Forward

Senior career*
Years	Team	Apps	(Gls)
1926–1928	FC Basel	7	(0)
- * Club domestic league appearances and goals

Hans Streng was a Swiss footballer who played two seasons for FC Basel in the late 1920s as a forward.

Streng joined Basel's first team in 1926. In his first season he played only one test match. In Basel's 1927–28 season he played nine games scoring one goal. Seven of these games were in the Swiss Serie A and two were friendly games.

Streng made his domestic league debut for the club in the away game on 4 December 1927 as Basel won 1–0 against Nordstern Basel. He scored his goal in the test game against Black Stars Basel on 28 August 1927.

== Sources ==
- Rotblau: Jahrbuch Saison 2017/2018. Publisher: FC Basel Marketing AG. ISBN 978-3-7245-2189-1
- Die ersten 125 Jahre. Publisher: Josef Zindel im Friedrich Reinhardt Verlag, Basel. ISBN 978-3-7245-2305-5
- Verein "Basler Fussballarchiv" Homepage
