= Alfred Heidig =

Swiss footballer

Personal information
- Full name: Alfred Heidig
- Place of birth: Switzerland
- Date of death: 29 September 1985
- Position: Defender

Senior career*
Years	Team	Apps	(Gls)
1925–1930	FC Basel	11	(0)
- * Club domestic league appearances and goals

Alfred Heidig was a Swiss footballer who played for FC Basel. He played as defender.

Heidig joined Basel's first team in 1925. He played his first game for the club in their first home game of the 1925–26 Serie A season in the Landhof on 6 September 1925 against Concordia Basel. The game was won by seven goals to nil.

Between the years 1925 and 1930 Heidig played a total of 20 games for Basel scoring one goal. 11 of these games were in the Swiss Serie A, three in the Swiss Cup and six were friendly games. He scored his only goal in the away test game on 31 January 1926 as Basel won 5–4 in Baden.

== Sources ==
- Rotblau: Jahrbuch Saison 2017/2018. Publisher: FC Basel Marketing AG. ISBN 978-3-7245-2189-1
- Die ersten 125 Jahre. Publisher: Josef Zindel im Friedrich Reinhardt Verlag, Basel. ISBN 978-3-7245-2305-5
- Verein "Basler Fussballarchiv" Homepage
