= Emil Arlt =

Swiss footballer

Personal information
- Full name: Emil Arlt
- Place of birth: Switzerland
- Positions: Midfielder; forward

Senior career*
Years	Team	Apps	(Gls)
1926–1928	FC Basel	19	(14)
- * Club domestic league appearances and goals

Emil Arlt was a Swiss footballer who played for FC Basel for two seasons. He played mainly as a forward, but also as a midfielder.

Arlt joined the first team of FC Basel in 1926. He made his debut for the club in the away game on 10 October 1926 against Old Boys. Basel won the game by four goals to one and Arlt scored two goals in this match. Between 1926 and 1928 he played 29 games for Basel and scored 23 goals; 19 games were in the Swiss Serie A, 2 in the Swiss Cup and 8 were friendlies. He scored 14 goals in the domestic league, the other 9 were scored during the friendlies.

== Sources ==
- Rotblau: Jahrbuch Saison 2017/2018. Publisher: FC Basel Marketing AG. ISBN 978-3-7245-2189-1
- Die ersten 125 Jahre. Publisher: Josef Zindel im Friedrich Reinhardt Verlag, Basel. ISBN 978-3-7245-2305-5
- Verein "Basler Fussballarchiv" Homepage
