= Ernst Nyffeler =

Swiss footballer

Personal information
- Full name: Ernst Nyffeler
- Place of birth: Switzerland
- Position: Forward

Senior career*
Years	Team	Apps	(Gls)
1925–1926	FC Basel	1	(0)
- * Club domestic league appearances and goals

Ernst Nyffeler was a Swiss footballer who played one season for FC Basel. He played as a forward.

In the 1925–26 season Nyffeler played four games for Basel and scored two goals. One of these games was in the Swiss Serie A and the other three were friendly games. He scored his goals in the test games, one against 1. FSV Mainz 05 on 5 April 1926 and one against Olympique Lillois three weeks later on 25 April.

== Sources ==
- Rotblau: Jahrbuch Saison 2017/2018. Publisher: FC Basel Marketing AG. ISBN 978-3-7245-2189-1
- Die ersten 125 Jahre. Publisher: Josef Zindel im Friedrich Reinhardt Verlag, Basel. ISBN 978-3-7245-2305-5
- Verein "Basler Fussballarchiv" Homepage
