= Percy Humphreys =

English footballer and manager

Personal information
- Date of birth: 3 December 1880
- Place of birth: Cambridge, England
- Date of death: 13 April 1959 (aged 78)
- Place of death: London, England
- Position: Inside right

Youth career
- Cambridge St Mary's

Senior career*
Years	Team	Apps	(Gls)
1900–1901	Queens Park Rangers	?	(?)
1901–1907	Notts County	189	(66)
1907	Leicester Fosse	26	(19)
1907–1909	Chelsea	45	(13)
1909–1911	Tottenham Hotspur	45	(24)
1911–1912	Leicester Fosse	14	(2)
1912–1913	Hartlepools United	28	(11)

International career
1903	England	1	(0)

Managerial career
- 1912–1913: Hartlepools United
- 1913–1914: FC Basel
- 1920–1922: Alessandria
- * Club domestic league appearances and goals

Percy Humphreys (3 December 1880 – 13 April 1959) was an English international footballer, who played at inside-right, who later became a football manager.

== Career ==
=== Club career ===
Humphrey's first Football League club was Notts County where he made 189 league appearances and scored 66 times. In the 1907–08 season, Humphreys joined Second Division Leicester Fosse but returned to the First Division with Chelsea for the latter part of the season. He remained with Chelsea until December 1909 when he lost his place to Vivian Woodward.

Humphreys swapped places with Woodward moving across London to join Tottenham Hotspur. Humphreys only made 45 league appearances for Spurs, scoring 24 goals, none of which were as vital as the one that he scored against Chelsea in the final match of the 1909–10 season which ensured that Chelsea were relegated instead of Spurs.

In October 1911, he was transferred back to Leicester Fosse where he spent the rest of the season. He then dropped out of the league to join Hartlepools United on a one-year contract ahead of the 1912–13 season. Humphreys suffered from recurring knee injuries but still managed 15 goals in 32 appearances.

=== International career ===
Humphreys made one appearance for England, on 4 April 1903, in a 2–1 defeat to Scotland at Bramall Lane.

=== Coaching career ===
Humphreys became player-manager of North Eastern League side Hartlepools United on 1 August 1912. Hartlepools finished in 12th place in his first season in charge. At the end of the season, Humphreys was offered a new one-year contract but could not agree financial terms and subsequently departed the club on 31 May 1913.

Humphreys then coached Swiss side FC Basel between 1913 and 1914. He had initially signed a three-year contract with the club but had to return to the UK after the outbreak of World War I. Humphreys signed briefly for Southern Football League club Norwich City.

He managed Alessandria, in Italy, from 1920 and 1922.

== Post-football ==
He later worked in the motor industry. Humphreys died in London in April 1959 at the age of 78 having suffered injuries during a fall.
