= Fritz Schneider (footballer) =

Swiss footballer

Personal information
- Full name: Fritz Schneider
- Place of birth: Switzerland
- Position: Striker

Senior career*
Years	Team	Apps	(Gls)
1922–1924	FC Basel	13	(1)
- * Club domestic league appearances and goals

Fritz Schneider was a Swiss footballer who played for FC Basel as a striker.

== Football career ==
Schneider joined Basel in 1922. Between the years 1922 and 1924 Schneider (I), as he was known, played a total of 29 games for Basel scoring a total of eight goals. 13 of these games were in the Swiss Serie A and 16 were friendly games. He scored one goal in the domestic league and the other seven were scored during the test games.

Schneider (I) played his domestic league debut on 1 October 1922 at the Landhof in the home draw against Nordstern Basel. He scored his domestic league goal during the 4–3 home win against Aarau on 4 March 1923.

== Sources ==
- Rotblau: Jahrbuch Saison 2017/2018. Publisher: FC Basel Marketing AG. ISBN 978-3-7245-2189-1
- Die ersten 125 Jahre. Publisher: Josef Zindel im Friedrich Reinhardt Verlag, Basel. ISBN 978-3-7245-2305-5
- Verein "Basler Fussballarchiv" Homepage
