= Max Breunig =

German footballer and manager

Personal information
- Date of birth: 12 November 1888
- Place of birth: Karlsruhe, Germany
- Date of death: 4 July 1961 (aged 72)
- Place of death: Pforzheim, West Germany
- Positions: Defender; midfielder

Youth career
- 1901–1908: Karlsruher FV

Senior career*
Years	Team	Apps	(Gls)
1908–1912	Karlsruher FV		
1912–1918	1. FC Pforzheim		

International career
1910–1913	Germany	9	(1)

Managerial career
- 1921–1922: Karlsruher FV
- 1922–1923: FC Basel
- 1926–1928: TSV München 1860
- 1930–1934: TSV München 1860
- * Club domestic league appearances and goals

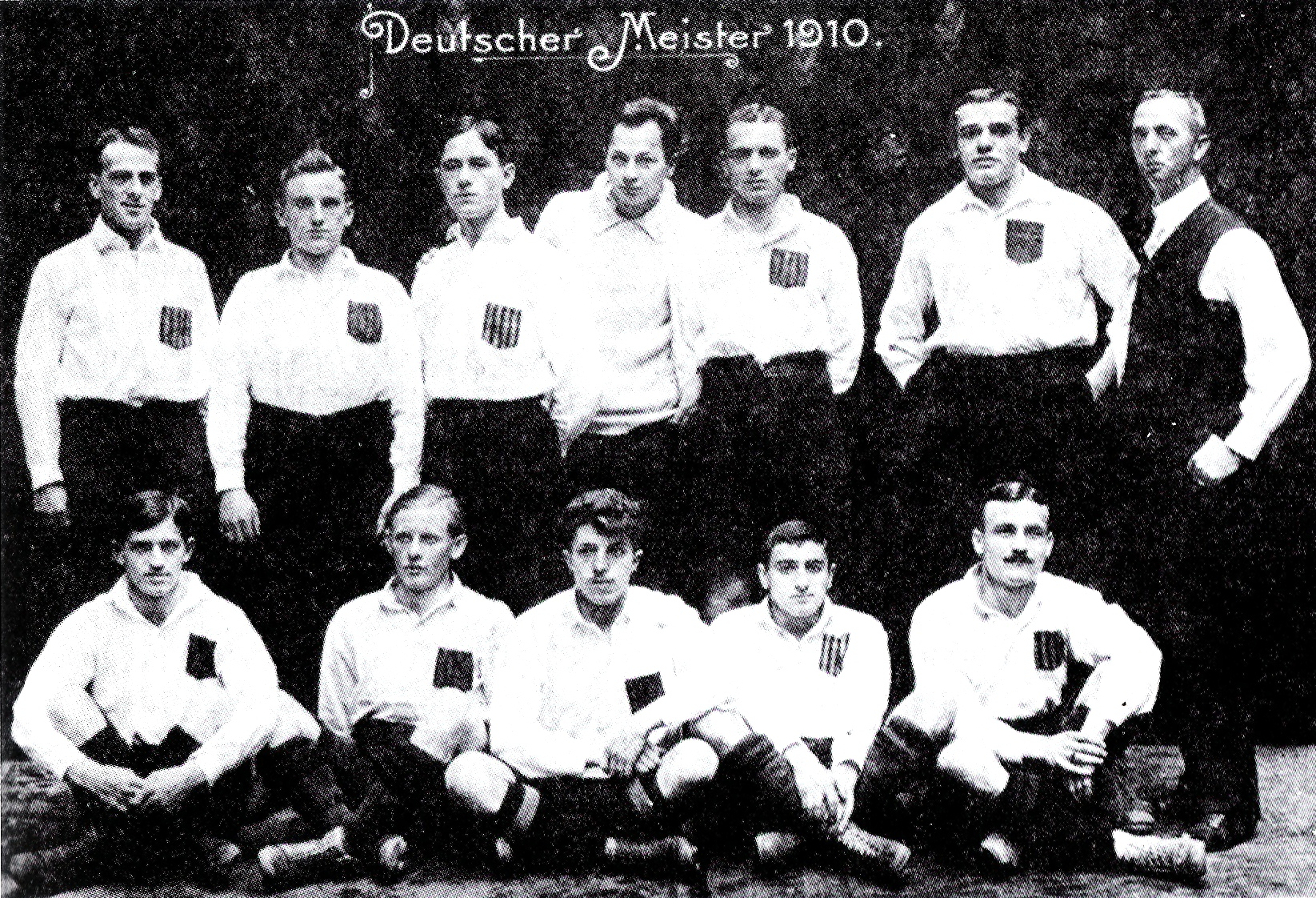

Max Breunig (12 November 1888 near Karlsruhe – 4 July 1961 in Pforzheim) was a German amateur football player who competed in the 1912 Summer Olympics.

Breunig, a midfielder, started his career at Karlsruher FV in 1908, and on the final day of the 1909/10 German League season, he scored the winning goal (a penalty kick) in a 1-0 win against Holstein Kiel to win the championship. In 1913 he signed for 1. FC Pforzheim but his football career ended when the First World War began.

He captained the Germany national team in all nine games he played for them was a member of the German 1912 Olympic squad and played one match in the main tournament. He scored one goal at international level.

After his playing days, he became a teacher and he also went on to manage Karlsruher from 1921 until 1922, FC Basel from 1922 to 1923 and TSV München 1860 from 1925 until 1928 and from 1930 until 1934.
