= Franz Zeiser =

Swiss footballer

Personal information
- Full name: Franz Joseph Zeiser
- Date of birth: 1902
- Place of birth: Dundenheim b. Offenburg (Germany)
- Date of death: 1989 (aged 86–87)
- Place of death: Riehen (BS), Switzerland
- Position: Striker

Senior career*
Years	Team	Apps	(Gls)
1921–1928	FC Basel	26	(1)
- * Club domestic league appearances and goals

Franz Zeiser was a Swiss footballer who played for FC Basel as a striker.

== Football career ==
Zeiser joined the Basel team in 1921. He played his domestic league debut on 23 October 1921 in the away fixture against FC Bern. He scored his domestic league goal during the 2–0 away win against Aarau on 29 October 1922.

Between the years 1921 and 1928 Zeiser played a total of 44 games for Basel scoring a total of two goals. 26 of these games were in the Swiss Serie A, one was in the Swiss Cup and 17 were friendly games. He scored one goal in the domestic league and the other one was scored during the test games.

== Sources ==
- Rotblau: Jahrbuch Saison 2017/2018. Publisher: FC Basel Marketing AG. ISBN 978-3-7245-2189-1
- Die ersten 125 Jahre. Publisher: Josef Zindel im Friedrich Reinhardt Verlag, Basel. ISBN 978-3-7245-2305-5
- Verein "Basler Fussballarchiv" Homepage
