= Gustav Putzendopler =

Austrian footballer

Personal information
- Full name: Gustav Putzendopler
- Date of birth: 16 January 1894
- Place of birth: Austria
- Date of death: 20 November 1969 (aged 75)
- Place of death: Basel, Switzerland
- Positions: Midfielder; striker

Senior career*
Years	Team	Apps	(Gls)
1912 – 1920	SK Rapid Wien	49	(0)
1920 – 1927	FC Basel	95	(3)
1927 – 1928	FC Mulhouse		

International career
1919 – 1920	Austria national football team	2	(0)

Managerial career
- 1927 – 1930: FC Mulhouse
- 1930 – 1932: FC Basel
- * Club domestic league appearances and goals

Gustav Putzendopler (16 January 1894; – 20 November 1969) was an Austrian international footballer who played for SK Rapid Wien, FC Basel and FC Mulhouse. He played in the position as midfielder.

== Football career ==
Putzendopler started his youth football and his football career by Rapid Wien. Between the years 1912 and 1920 he played a total of 49 games in the Austrian Championship and numerous test matches for Rapid without scoring a goal. During the 1919/20 season Putzendopler played two games for the national team of Austria.

During 1920 he and his brother Karl Putzendopler moved to Switzerland to find work. Both had suffered due to the First World War, in fact Gustav had been held captured by the Russians for over 40 months. The brothers had completed an apprenticeship in Galvanoplastic and after the War both were unable to find an occupation in their home country. In Basel they both found work and both joined FC Basel and settled in quickly, they played regularly.

A note to an outrage and scandal after the 8th round match at the Landhof on 12 November 1922 against BSC Young Boys. It came to some massive disagreements between Basel manager Breunig's co-trainer Mr Sutter, the players of both teams and some fans. The Swiss Football Association started an enquiry immediately and postponed the match Basel against Luzern from 3 December 1922 to 18 February the following year. After an appeal the results of the enquiry ended with following decision: The club Basel was fined 200 Swiss Francs, co-trainer Mr Sutter was banned for three years, Basel's player Gustav Putzendopler was banned from playing for six months, Young Boy's players Osterwalder and von Arx were both fined 20 Swiss Francs, Referee Josef Wieland received a life long ban from the top tier of Swiss football.

Between the years 1920 and 1927 Gustav Putzendopler played a total of 175 games for Basel, scoring a total of seven goals. 95 of these games were in the Swiss Serie A, three in the Swiss Cup and 77 were friendly games. He scored three goals in the domestic league, the other four were scored during the test games.

For the 1927/28 season Putzendopler transferred to FC Mulhouse as player-manager. For the 1930/31 season he returned to FC Basel as first team manager.

== Sources ==
- Rotblau: Jahrbuch Saison 2017/2018. Publisher: FC Basel Marketing AG. ISBN 978-3-7245-2189-1
- Die ersten 125 Jahre. Publisher: Josef Zindel im Friedrich Reinhardt Verlag, Basel. ISBN 978-3-7245-2305-5
- Verein "Basler Fussballarchiv" Homepage
