= Jacques Steiner =

Swiss footballer (1903-1968)

Personal information
- Full name: Jacques (Jack) Steiner
- Date of birth: 1903
- Place of birth: Switzerland
- Date of death: 17 December 1968 (aged 64–65)
- Position: Midfielder

Senior career*
Years	Team	Apps	(Gls)
1925–1927	FC Basel	4	(0)
- * Club domestic league appearances and goals

Jacques (Jack) Steiner (1903 – 17 December 1968) was a Swiss footballer who played for FC Basel. He played in the position as midfielder. Steiner joined the Basel first team in 1925.

In the two seasons 1925/26 and 1926/27 Steiner played a total of six games for Basel without scoring a goal. Four of these games were in the Swiss Serie A and two were friendly games. His domestic league debut was on 18 October 1925 in the Landhof against Grenchen which Basel won 1–0.

== Sources ==
- Rotblau: Jahrbuch Saison 2017/2018. Publisher: FC Basel Marketing AG. ISBN 978-3-7245-2189-1
- Die ersten 125 Jahre. Publisher: Josef Zindel im Friedrich Reinhardt Verlag, Basel. ISBN 978-3-7245-2305-5
- Verein "Basler Fussballarchiv" Homepage
