= Karl Ibach (footballer) =

Swiss footballer (1892-1953)

Personal information
- Full name: Karl Ibach
- Date of birth: 1892
- Place of birth: Switzerland
- Date of death: 22 February 1953 (aged 60–61)
- Position: Forward

Senior career*
Years	Team	Apps	(Gls)
1910–1922	FC Basel	6	(0)
- * Club domestic league appearances and goals

Karl Ibach (1892 – 22 February 1953) was a Swiss footballer who played for FC Basel as a forward.

Between the years 1910 and 1922 Ibach played 19 games for Basel scoring 2 goals. Six of these games were in the Swiss Serie A and 13 were friendly games. He scored both goals in the friendlies.

He was also member of the FC Basel board of directors. He presided over the club's board after the AGM before the 1913–14 season until 25 September 1913. From that date Carl Albert Hintermann took over as chairman. He was again chairman of the club from 1922 until 1925 and between 1927 and 1928.

== Sources and references ==
- Rotblau: Jahrbuch Saison 2017/2018. Publisher: FC Basel Marketing AG. ISBN 978-3-7245-2189-1
