= Arthur Fahr =

Swiss footballer (1898-1968)

Personal information
- Date of birth: 1898
- Date of death: 9 May 1968 (aged 69–70)
- Place of death: Basel
- Positions: Goalkeeper; forward

Senior career*
| Years | Team | Apps | (Gls) |
| 1914–1927 | FC Basel | 112 | (6) |
- * Club domestic league appearances and goals

Arthur 'Pius' Fahr (1898 – 9 May 1968) was a Swiss footballer who played for FC Basel.

'Pius' Fahr started his playing career as goalkeeper and in later years he played mainly in the position as forward. Between the years 1914 and 1927 he played a total of 208 games for Basel scoring a total of 18 goals. 112 of these games were in the Swiss Serie A and 96 were friendly games. He scored 6 goals in the domestic league, the other 12 were scored during the test games. He scored his first goal for Basel in the home game against Aarau on 19 March 1922. It was the winning goal in the 2–1 victory.

== Sources and references ==
- Rotblau: Jahrbuch Saison 2017/2018. Publisher: FC Basel Marketing AG. ISBN 978-3-7245-2189-1
- Die ersten 125 Jahre. Publisher: Josef Zindel im Friedrich Reinhardt Verlag, Basel. ISBN 978-3-7245-2305-5
- Verein "Basler Fussballarchiv" Homepage
