= Karl Putzendopler =

Austrian footballer (1898–1983)

Personal information
- Full name: Karl Putzendopler
- Date of birth: 24 April 1898
- Place of birth: Austria
- Date of death: 11 January 1983 (aged 84)
- Place of death: Basel, Switzerland
- Position: Midfielder

Senior career*
Years	Team	Apps	(Gls)
1918 – 1920	Rapid Wien	4	(0)
1920 – 1927	Basel	79	(5)
1928 – 1929	Black Stars Basel		

Managerial career
- 1928 – 1932: Black Stars Basel
- * Club domestic league appearances and goals

Karl Putzendopler (24 April 1898 – 11 January 1983) was an Austrian footballer who played for SK Rapid Wien and FC Basel. He played in the position as midfielder.

== Football career ==
Putzendopler started his youth football and his football career by Rapid Wien. During the season 1919/20 he played a total of four games in the Austrian Championship.

During 1920 he and his elder brother Gustav Putzendopler moved to Switzerland to find work. Both had suffered due to the First World War, in fact Gustav had been held captured by the Russians for over 40 months. The brothers had completed an apprenticeship in Galvanoplastic and after the War both were unable to find an occupation in their home country. In Basel they both found work and both joined FC Basel and settled in quickly, they played regularly.

Between the years 1920 and 1927 Putzendopler played a total of 154 games for Basel scoring a total of 10 goals. 79 of these games were in the Swiss Serie A, three in the Swiss Cup and 72 were friendly games. He scored five goals in the domestic league, the other five were scored during the test games.

Putzendopler went on to become player-coach of Black Stars Basel. Under him the team won promotion to the 1930–31 Swiss Serie A, but winning only four points that season they suffered immediate relegation.

== Sources ==
- Rotblau: Jahrbuch Saison 2017/2018. Publisher: FC Basel Marketing AG. ISBN 978-3-7245-2189-1
- Die ersten 125 Jahre. Publisher: Josef Zindel im Friedrich Reinhardt Verlag, Basel. ISBN 978-3-7245-2305-5
- Verein "Basler Fussballarchiv" Homepage
