= Paul Nebiker =

Swiss footballer

Personal information
- Full name: Paul Nebiker
- Place of birth: Switzerland
- Date of death: 18 March 1928
- Position: Forward

Senior career*
Years	Team	Apps	(Gls)
1923–1927	FC Basel	4	(0)
- * Club domestic league appearances and goals

Paul Nebiker (died 18 March 1928) was a Swiss footballer who played for FC Basel. He played as a forward.

== Football career ==
Nebiker joined Basel in 1923 and played for them for four seasons. During his first season he only played in three test games. He made his domestic league debut on 14 September 1924 away to Luzern. Basel won the game 1–0, but because Luzern used an ineligible player, the match was awarded to Basel as a 3–0 win. His last game for FC Basel was against Young Boys on 5 December 1926.

Between 1923 and 1926 Nebiker played ten games for Basel and scored once. Four games were in the Swiss Serie A and six were friendlies. He scored his only goal during the friendly against Olympique Lillois in France which ended as a 3–3 draw.

== Sources ==
- Rotblau: Jahrbuch Saison 2017/2018. Publisher: FC Basel Marketing AG. ISBN 978-3-7245-2189-1
- Die ersten 125 Jahre. Publisher: Josef Zindel im Friedrich Reinhardt Verlag, Basel. ISBN 978-3-7245-2305-5
- Verein "Basler Fussballarchiv" Homepage
