= Hans Rau =

Swiss footballer

Personal information
- Full name: Hans Rau
- Place of birth: Switzerland
- Position: Forward

Senior career*
Years	Team	Apps	(Gls)
1922–1928	FC Basel	22	(4)
1929–1930	Concordia Basel		
- * Club domestic league appearances and goals

Hans Rau was a Swiss footballer who played for FC Basel and Concordia Basel. He played mainly as a forward, but also as a midfielder.

== Football career ==
Rau joined Basel in 1922. During his first few seasons he only played in test games. He played his domestic league debut on 14 September 1924 in the away game against Luzern. Rau scored his first goal for his club during the same match and Basel won 1–0. The result was later changed to 30 forfait because Luzern used an unqualified player.

Between the years 1922 and 1928 Rau played a total of 40 games for Basel scoring a total of 7 goals. 22 of these games were in the Swiss Serie A, one in the Swiss Cup and 17 were friendly games. He scored four goal in the domestic league, the other three were scored during the test games.

His last game for FC Basel was a test match on 15 April 1928. He then moved on to play for Concordia Basel

== Sources ==
- Rotblau: Jahrbuch Saison 2017/2018. Publisher: FC Basel Marketing AG. ISBN 978-3-7245-2189-1
- Die ersten 125 Jahre. Publisher: Josef Zindel im Friedrich Reinhardt Verlag, Basel. ISBN 978-3-7245-2305-5
- Verein "Basler Fussballarchiv" Homepage
