= Peter Riesterer =

Swiss footballer (1892-1979)

Personal information
- Full name: Peter Riesterer
- Date of birth: 10 September 1892
- Date of death: 1979 (Age 87)
- Place of death: Switzerland
- Position: Defender

Senior career*
Years	Team	Apps	(Gls)
1913–1930	FC Basel	149	(6)
- * Club domestic league appearances and goals

Peter Riesterer (10 September 1892 – 1979) was a Swiss footballer who played for FC Basel. He played mainly in the position of defender.

Between the years 1913 and 1930 Riesterer played a total of 244 games for Basel, scoring a total of 9 goals. 149 of these games were in the Swiss Serie A, four in the Swiss Cup and 90 were friendly games. He scored six goals in the domestic league, the other three were scored during the test games.

== Sources ==
- Rotblau: Jahrbuch Saison 2017/2018. Publisher: FC Basel Marketing AG. ISBN 978-3-7245-2189-1
- Die ersten 125 Jahre. Publisher: Josef Zindel im Friedrich Reinhardt Verlag, Basel. ISBN 978-3-7245-2305-5
