= 1925–26 Swiss Serie A =

Swiss football season

Swiss Serie A
- Season: 1925–26

Statistics of Swiss Super League in the 1925–26 season.

== East ==
=== Table ===
Pos	Team	Pld	W	D	L	GF	GA	GD	Pts
1	Grasshopper Club Zürich	16	13	1	2	63	20	+43	27
2	Young Fellows Zürich	16	12	0	4	55	24	+31	24
3	Blue Stars Zürich	16	8	2	6	44	28	+16	18
4	FC Zürich	16	7	3	6	35	30	+5	17
5	FC Lugano	16	7	2	7	37	29	+8	16
6	Brühl St. Gallen	16	7	1	8	27	41	−14	15
7	FC Winterthur	16	5	4	7	32	44	−12	14
8	FC St. Gallen	16	2	4	10	17	52	−35	8
9	Sportclub Veltheim	16	2	1	13	12	54	−42	5

Source: rsssf.com

=== Results ===
Home \ Away	BSZ	BRÜ	GCZ	LUG	STG	VEL	WIN	YFZ	ZÜR
Blue Stars Zürich		5–1	1–2	2–1	4–1	3–0	1–2	3–0	6–1
Brühl	3–2		3–2	2–1	3–1	1–1	3–2	1–3	1–4
Grasshopper	4–0	7–0		2–0	7–1	9–0	1–0	3–1	2–1
Lugano	3–3	3–1	4–2		2–3	5–0	0–2	4–2	3–1
St. Gallen	1–1	1–2	6–0	0–0		2–1	3–3	1–4	1–2
Veltheim	0–4	0–3	3–6	3–2	2–0		1–3	0–3	0–4
Winterthur	3–7	3–1	3–5	1–5	1–1	3–0		2–8	2–2
Young Fellows	3–0	2–1	1–3	5–3	9–1	5–1	3–0		2–1
Zürich	3–2	4–1	2–2	0–1	5–0	1–0	3–3	1–4	

Legend: Blue = home team win; Yellow = draw; Red = away team win.

== Central ==
=== Table ===
Pos	Team	Pld	W	D	L	GF	GA	GD	Pts
1	Young Boys Bern	16	14	1	1	46	10	+36	29
2	FC Basel	16	7	6	3	26	14	+12	20
3	FC Bern	16	9	2	5	28	16	+12	20
4	Nordstern Basel	16	8	2	6	34	31	+3	18
5	FC Solothurn	16	7	1	8	30	31	−1	15
6	FC Aarau	16	6	3	7	29	36	−7	15
7	Old Boys Basel	16	5	2	9	24	31	−7	12
8	FC Concordia Basel	16	3	2	11	15	49	−34	8
9	FC Grenchen	16	3	1	12	27	41	−14	7

Source: rsssf.com

=== Results ===
Home \ Away	AAR	BAS	BER	CON	GRE	NOR	OBB	SOL	YB
Aarau		1–1	1–1	4–1	2–1	4–5	0–3	1–2	1–2
Basel	1–3		0–2	7–0	1–0	1–1	2–2	1–1	2–0
Bern	5–0	0–0		1–2	3–1	4–2	3–2	2–0	1–2
Concordia	1–1	0–3	1–0		3–3	2–3	0–1	0–2	0–7
Grenchen	5–0	1–2	1–2	4–0		3–4	1–3	2–4	0–3
Nordstern	2–6	0–1	0–1	2–0	5–0		1–0	3–1	1–2
Old Boys	1–3	0–2	1–3	3–0	1–4	1–1		4–2	1–3
Solothurn	1–2	2–1	2–1	2–5	5–2	1–8	4–2		1–3
Young Boys	4–0	1–1	2–0	6–0	3–1	4–1	3–0	1–0	

Legend: Blue = home team win; Yellow = draw; Red = away team win.

== West ==
=== Table ===
Pos	Team	Pld	W	D	L	GF	GA	GD	Pts
1	Servette Genf	16	11	1	4	51	21	+30	23
2	Etoile La Chaux-de-Fonds	16	8	6	2	33	18	+15	22
3	FC La Chaux-de-Fonds	16	7	3	6	24	38	−14	17
4	Etoile Carouge	16	6	4	6	29	19	+10	16
5	Urania Geneve Sports	16	6	2	8	22	25	−3	14
6	Cantonal Neuchatel	16	6	2	8	24	30	−6	14
7	FC Biel Bienne	16	5	3	8	25	20	+5	13
8	Lausanne Sports	16	6	1	9	29	41	−12	13
9	FC Fribourg	16	5	2	9	17	42	−25	12

Source: rsssf.com

=== Results ===
Home \ Away	BIE	CAN	CDF	ÉTC	ÉTS	FRI	LS	SER	UGS
Biel		1–2	7–0	0–0	1–3	1–3	5–0	1–0	9–0
Cantonal Neuchâtel	0–1		1–4	3–1	1–0	2–0	3–4	2–1	3–2
Chaux-de-Fonds	2–1	3–2		0–5	1–1	2–2	2–1	2–8	0–2
Étoile Carouge	0–0	1–1	2–3		2–3	1–0	1–0	0–1	2–0
Étoile-Sporting	3–2	1–1	0–0	1–1		4–1	5–0	1–1	2–2
Fribourg	1–0	2–1	2–1	0–7	2–3		1–4	2–3	2–1
Lausanne-Sports	2–2	2–1	2–0	0–4	1–4	6–0		1–4	2–1
Servette	4–2	5–0	1–2	4–1	1–2	7–1	5–2		2–0
Urania	2–1	2–1	1–2	3–1	1–0	0–0	3–2	2–4	

Legend: Blue = home team win; Yellow = draw; Red = away team win.

== Final ==
=== Table ===
Pos	Team	Pld	W	D	L	GF	GA	GD	Pts
1	Servette Genf	2	1	1	0	7	4	+3	3
1	Grasshopper Club Zürich	2	1	1	0	7	5	+2	3
3	Young Boys Bern	2	0	0	2	5	10	−5	0

Source: rsssf.com

=== Results ===
Team 1	Score	Team 2
13 June 1926
Young Boys	3–5	Grasshopper
20 June 1926
Servette	5–2	Young Boys
27 June 1926
Grasshopper	2–2	Servette

=== Championship play-off ===
Team 1	Score	Team 2
4 July 1926
Servette	3–2	Grasshopper

Servette Genf won the championship.

== Sources ==
- Switzerland 1925-26 at RSSSF
