= FC Solothurn =

Swiss football club

- Full name: Fussball-Club Solothurn
- Founded: 1 July 1901; 124 years ago
- Ground: Stadion FC Solothurn, Switzerland
- Capacity: 6,750
- Chairman: Marc Kalousek
- Manager: Gilles Yapi Yapo
- League: 1. Liga Classic
- 2024–25: Group 2, 6th of 16
- Website: https://www.fcsolothurn.ch
Home colours	Away colours

FC Solothurn is a Swiss football club based in Solothurn, Switzerland. The club has formerly played in the Challenge League (2nd tier) and currently play in 1. Liga Classic (4th tier).

FC Solothurn is ranking as the number 1 club of Switzerland in the all-time table of the 1. Liga.

== History ==
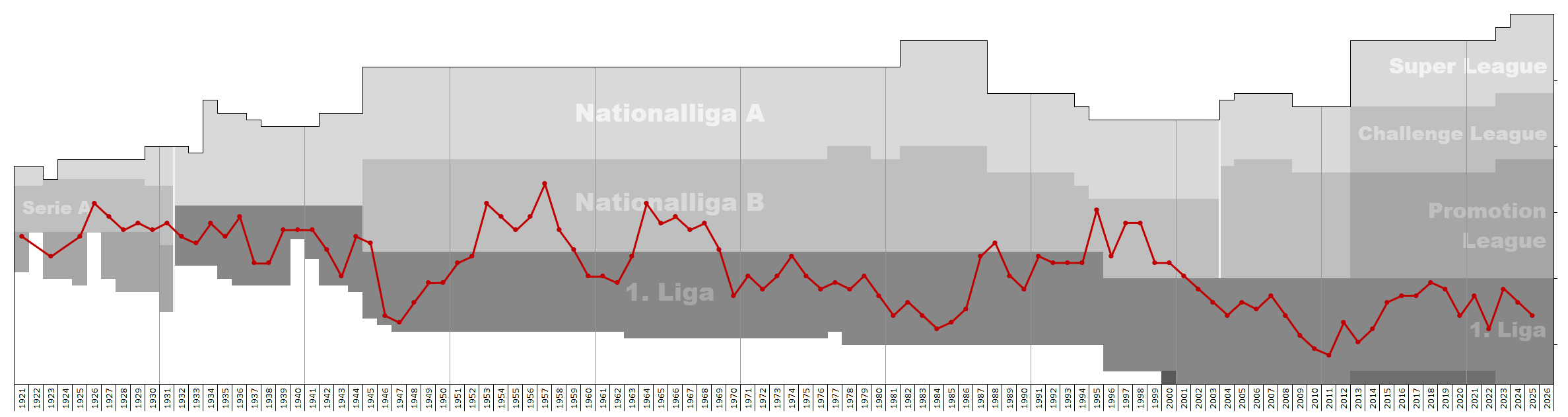
Chart of FC Solothurn table positions in the Swiss football league system

From season 1925–26 to 1930–31, when a new system got introduced, FC Solothurn played in the highest football league in Switzerland.

The former manager of Grasshopper Club Zürich, Hanspeter Latour, managed FC Solothurn for 13 years in 1983–1996. In the 1997–98 season the club reached the Promotion Group to the Nationalliga A and missed the promotion by one point. 2001 the club was in the last place in the Nationalliga B and was relegated to the 1. Liga, where it plays since then.

== Recent seasons ==
- 2000–01: Nationalliga B 8th in Abstiegsrunde (relegated)
- 2001–11: 1. Liga
- 2011–: 1. Liga Classic

== Honours ==
- Uhrencup
  - Winners (1): 1998

== Current squad ==
As of 1 November 2021.

Note: Flags indicate national team as defined under FIFA eligibility rules; some limited exceptions apply. Players may hold more than one non-FIFA nationality.

No.	Pos.	Nation	Player
1	GK	SUI	Tim Wagner
4	DF	SUI	Onno Koekenbier
5	DF	SUI	Yves Kaiser
6	DF	SUI	Fabian Kohler
7	DF	SUI	Noah Gräf
8	MF	SUI	Shpetim Arifi
9	FW	SUI	Loic Chatton
10	MF	SUI	Hannes Hunziker
11	DF	SUI	Daniel Mzee
12	DF	SUI	David Stuber
14	DF	MKD	Enis Musai

No.	Pos.	Nation	Player
16	MF	SUI	Jano Loosli
17	FW	SUI	Emmanuel Mast
18	MF	SUI	Robin Huser
20	MF	SUI	Marco Mathys
22	FW	SUI	Augustin Nushi
23	DF	SUI	Noel Anderegg
24	DF	SUI	Philippe Gerspacher
25	FW	SUI	Fabio Bruni
26	MF	SUI	Sebastian Gerspacher
30	GK	SUI	Colin Bähler

=== Out on loan ===
Note: Flags indicate national team as defined under FIFA eligibility rules; some limited exceptions apply. Players may hold more than one non-FIFA nationality.

No.	Pos.	Nation	Player
