= Janet Adler =

American teacher and dance therapist (1941-2023)

- Image by Jens Wazel
- Born: February 20, 1941
- Died: July 19, 2023 (aged 82)
- Occupations: Dance therapist; Pastoral counselor; Creator, Discipline of Authentic Movement
- Honors: CINE Golden Eagle Award; Landers Associates Award of Merit; Rio de Janeiro International Film Festival/First Prize and Fritz Feigl Trophy; Lifetime of work, Somatics Festival 2019

Janet Adler (1941–2023) was an American teacher and pioneer in the fields of dance therapy, somatic practices, and Authentic Movement.

Early in her career, her prize-winning film, Looking For Me (1968), was influential in introducing movement into therapy for autistic children. This work evolved over her 50-year career, as she conceived and refined the "Discipline of Authentic Movement", an embodied awareness practice with roots in dance, healing, and mystical tradition.

Through decades, Adler sustained an on-going teaching practice, giving many lectures, seminars, and keynote addresses. At the age of 78, she was honored for her lifetime of work at the Somatics Festival 2019, a five-day gathering in Northampton, Massachusetts. Her many years of international teaching have created a wide and growing global community of practitioners.

In 2022, Berlin filmmaker Jens Wazel travelled to British Columbia to interview Adler about her historic contributions and influence on the field of conscious dance, resulting in the film, LIGHT | Five Days With Janet Adler.

Janet Adler's archives are housed at the Jerome Robbins Dance Division of the New York Public Library.

== Personal history and education ==
Janet Rosalyn Adler was born on February 20, 1941, and reared in Frankfort, Indiana. The daughter of Roslyn (Posy) Woolf Adler and Leon S. Adler, she loved dance from an early age. As a young adult, profoundly interested in the relationship between movement and the inner life, Adler apprenticed with Marian Chace, a leading founder of dance therapy in the United States, and learned from her how the unconscious lives in the body.

Adler studied at the University of Pittsburgh for her 1968 Master's thesis, The Effects of Dance Therapy on a Young Non-verbal Child. The film Looking for Me documented her early work with children on the autism spectrum.

Adler married John Boettiger, and was the mother of Joshua Adler Boettiger (b. 1973), Paul Woolf Adler Boettiger (b. 1977), and the grandmother of Paloma Grajwer Boettiger (b. 2011). The Boettigers separated in 1980. Adler married Philip Buller, sculptor, painter, and musician, and they moved to Sebastapol in Northern California.

Adler earned her Ph.D. at the Union Institute in 1992 with her dissertation, Arching Backward and a Cross-Cultural Study of Mysticism as the Context for a Phenomenological Study.

She died July 19, 2023 at the age of 82, at home on Galiano Island, BC, Canada.

== Career ==
Adler's dance-movement therapy work with children with autism, in the mid to late 1960s, was groundbreaking in its understanding of the body as the basis for shared communication. In post-graduate studies, beginning in 1966 at the Western Psychiatric Institute and Clinic at University of Pittsburgh Medical Center, Adler was introduced to the "Natural History" approach to phenomenological research. Developed by Ray Birdwhistle, who founded kinesics as a field of inquiry, the method made use of filmed interactions between people. Analyzing movement cues through frame-by-frame observation of film footage of her work with two of the children, Adler trained her eye to track the physical and relational details of their interactions. Adler's film, Looking for Me (1968), containing some of this footage, documents her early success in forming healing relationships through movement.

From the summer of 1969 through the spring of 1970, Adler immersed in life-changing work with two formative teachers, John Weir and Mary Whitehouse, who both taught at Esalen in the 1960s. From Weir, a psychologist associated with the human potential movement, Adler learned group processes, the importance of a language system, somatic knowledge, and the phenomenon of witnessing. Whitehouse was a dancer and teacher who, inspired by her own experience of Jungian analysis, developed an inner-directed approach to movement she called, "movement-in-depth." Following five months of intensive, often daily, practice and study with Whitehouse, Adler returned to the East Coast, where she worked with therapy clients for ten years.

=== Authentic movement: a practice of mover and witness in relationship ===
In 1981, Adler's long-held questions concerning relationship with self and others became formalized with her opening of the Mary Whitehouse Institute, marking a change in her professional work from therapist to teacher. With a group of interns and inspired by what she had received from Whitehouse, Adler developed a practice with two specific roles: a mover (moving with eyes closed in the presence of a non-judgmental, attentive witness) and a witness (sitting to the side offering open-eyed presence); she called it Authentic Movement.

Adler's teaching focused on and studied the experience of the mover, the experience of the witness, and the relationship between the two. All together she described this as the "ground form", the foundation necessary for individual healing within personality development. In the presence of a trusted outer witness and with the experience of being seen, the mover's inner witness develops, becoming more adept at seeing self and others without judgement or projection, and more capable of being present. Keenly interested in the relationship between the language of body and the language of words, Adler believed a speaking practice was an important counterpart to the movement practice, and essential to the developing voice of the inner witness.

While teaching at the Mary Whitehouse Institute, Adler was in the midst of an unanticipated experience of kundalini (1979-1986) during which she received direct experiences of energetic phenomena such as vibration and light with great intensity in and through her body. Adler attributed her capacity to witness herself through these experiences to her ten years of practicing Authentic Movement. The insights and questions generated by the accompanying visions within her early years of teaching are reflected in Adler's seminal essay, "Who is the Witness?" (1987), and in her book, Arching Backward: The Mystical Initiation of a Contemporary Woman (1995). These new perspectives led Adler to distinguish between movement originating in personality or personal history and movement arising from a transpersonal source. As the work evolved, Adler came to call the practice the "Discipline of Authentic Movement", distinguishing it from other approaches within the wider field of Authentic Movement.

In 1986, Adler moved to Northern California, where some of her teaching practice focused on the relationship between the discipline and the distinct realms of mystical text, mystical dance, kundalini, the process of initiation, Jewish mysticism, and the practice of psychotherapy. For her Ph.D, from the Union Institute (1992), Adler engaged in a historical and cross-cultural study of mystical traditions, providing a universal context for her understanding of the developing inner witness as a key aspect of developing consciousness.

=== The individual and the collective body ===
Beginning in the late 1980s, as Adler's evolving questions focused on the individual's relationship to the collective, she began to work with larger groups. Adler's film, Still Looking (1988), reflects this phase of her teaching. In 1994, Adler gave the keynote address in Berlin at the first International Dance Therapy Conference. Her essay, "The Collective Body" (1994,1996), adapted from this lecture, introduces how the development of embodied consciousness within a group is made possible because of enough inner witness development among the individuals participating within the group.

In 2006, Adler moved from California to Galiano Island in British Columbia, where the teaching practice she initiated in 1981 developed into full maturity. Her essay "The Mandorla and the Discipline of Authentic Movement (2015)", articulates this evolution of a contemporary mystical practice that is secular and open to anyone from any background who has an interest in human development and the evolution of human consciousness.

=== Witness consciousness in the world ===
While still in California, from 1988 to 2005, Adler worked in hospice care, eventually becoming an interfaith chaplain. After moving to Galiano Island, she co-founded and directed a volunteer community program, "Transitions in Dying and Grieving," from 2007-2023. At the 2009 American Dance Therapy Association conference, Adler spoke about this aspect of her work when she presented that year's Marian Chace Lecture: "A Witness to A Conscious Death."

In 2013, Adler founded Circles of Four, an international center for preparing teachers of the Discipline of Authentic Movement. In her final years, Adler continued her active engagement with Circles of Four, her writing, and one last project, a film with Jens Wazel. In his book about the making of the film, Wazel described Adler as an exceptional teacher who fully embodied everything she taught, "not only talking about her work; she was her work."

== Selected publications ==
Adler's work has been translated into French, German, Chinese, Italian, Polish, Russian, and Spanish.

=== Books ===
- Intimacy in Emptiness: An Evolution of Embodied Consciousness: Adler's collected writings co-edited with introductions and commentary by Bonnie Morrissey and Paula Sager (2022)
- Offering from the Conscious Body: The Discipline of Authentic Movement (2002)
- Arching Backward: The Mystical Initiation of a Contemporary Woman (1995)

In addition to numerous articles and interviews, a selection of her essays appear in Authentic Movement: Essays by Mary Starks Whitehouse, Janet Adler and Joan Chodorow (1999), and Authentic Movement: Moving the Body, Moving the Self, Being Moved (2007), both edited by Patrizia Pallaro.

=== Films ===
Looking For Me (1968), produced and directed by Janet Adler, documents her early research. Looking For Me was funded by the Falk Foundation and received multiple awards:

- CINE Golden Eagle Award
- Landers Associates Award of Merit
- Rio de Janeiro International Film Festival/First Prize and Fritz Feigl Trophy

as well as honoree awards from:

- American Psychological Association
- American Psychiatric Association
- American Speech- Language-Hearing Association
- Council for Exceptional Children
- National Coalition of Arts Therapy Associations

Still Looking (1988), produced and directed by Janet Adler, is a film about Authentic Movement. It received the International Film and TV Festival of New York Finalist Award, and the Dance on Camera Honorable Mention.

Light | Five Days with Janet Adler (2023) with Berlin-based filmmaker Jens Wazel, who visited Janet Adler on Galiano Island, B.C., in May 2022. Their collaboration resulted in this homage to her life and legacy.
