= 1924–25 FC Basel season =

FC Basel
1924–25 season
- Chairman: Karl Ibach
- First team coach: Gustav Putzendopler (as team captain)
- Ground: Landhof, Basel
- Serie A: Group Stage: 4th
- Top goalscorer: League: Emil Breh (7); All: Emil Breh (7)
- Highest home attendance: 3,500 on 16 November 1924 vs Young Boys
- Lowest home attendance: 1,500 on 3 May 1925 vs Grenchen
- Average home league attendance: 2,225

The FC Basel 1924–25 season was their thirty-second season since the club's foundation on 15 November 1893. The club's chairman was Karl Ibach in his third season as chairman in his second period as chairman. FC Basel played their home games in the Landhof in the district Wettstein in Kleinbasel.

== Overview ==
Gustav Putzendopler was team captain this season and as captain he led the team trainings and was responsible for the line-ups. Basel played a total of 28 matches in their 1924–25 season. 16 of these were in the domestic league, and 12 were friendly matches. Of these 12 friendlies only two were played at home in the Landhof and 10 were away games, seven in Switzerland, one in Strasbourg and two in Zagreb. Only two test games ended with a victory, the other ten all ended with a defeat. In these tests Basel scored just 11 goals but they conceded 34.

This season the Serie A was again divided into three regional groups, East, Central and West, each group with nine teams. Basel were allocated to the Central group together with the other teams from the city Concordia Basel, Nordstern Basel and Old Boys Basel. The further teams allocated to this group were Young Boys Bern, FC Bern, Aarau, Luzern and the newly promoted FC Grenchen. The team that won each group would continue to the finals and the last placed team in the group had to play a barrage against relegation.

Basel started their season well, only being defeated once in their first eleven games. They were always up with the table leaders, however at the end of the season three defeats against the other leading teams Aarau, Old Boys and lastly FC Bern, cost them their place at the top of the table. The team finished in fourth position, four points behind FC Bern, one point behind Aarau and level with Old Boys. During their league season Basel won seven of their matches, drawing five and were defeated four times. In their 16 league matches the team scored just 13 goals (the first game of the season ended 1–0, but later awarded 3–0). FC Bern won the central group and advanced to the finals. West group winners Servette won the championship, Bern were runners-up and east group winners Young Fellows Zürich were third. Luzern were last in the central group. They thus played the promotion-relegation barrage against Solothurn. Solothurn achieved promotion, Luzern were relegated.

Emil Breh was Basel's top league goal scorer with seven goals. Breh had joined the team before the season started and left the club at the end of it. Ernst Zorzotti was the team's second top scorer with just two goals. Four players each scored one goal, Karl Bielser, Arthur Fahr, Hans Rau and Hans Schneider. The other two goal scorers were not recorded.

== Players ==
Squad members

Note: Flags indicate national team as defined under FIFA eligibility rules; some limited exceptions apply. Players may hold more than one non-FIFA nationality.

No.	Pos.	Nation	Player
—	GK	SUI	Theodor Schär
—	GK	SUI	Ernst Zorzotti
—	DF	AUT	Gustav Putzendopler (I)
—	DF	SUI	Peter Riesterer
—	MF	SUI	Max Galler (II)
—	MF	SUI	Ernst Kaltenbach
—	MF	AUT	Karl Putzendopler (II)
—	FW	SUI	Arthur Fahr
—	FW	SUI	Karl Bielser
—	FW	SUI	Heinrich Hess
—	FW	SUI	Paul Nebiker
—	FW	SUI	Hans Rau

No.	Pos.	Nation	Player
—	FW	SUI	Fritz Schneider (I)
—	FW	SUI	Franz Zeiser
—		SUI	Wilhelm Flubacher
—		SUI	Hans Schneider (II)
—	FW	SUI	Max Strasser
—	FW	SUI	August von Arx
—			Emil Breh
—			? Bürgin
—			Fritz Eichenberger
—		SUI	? Flubacher (I)
—		SUI	? Flubacher (II)
—			Gustav Isler

== Results ==
Legend

Win Draw Loss Postponed

=== Friendly matches ===
==== Pre- and mid-season ====
24 August 1924 Pre-season	RC Strasbourg (France)	1–3	(Switzerland) Basel	Strasbourg
	Goal	Summary	Goal

7 September 1924 Pre-season	Fribourg (Switzerland)	4–5	(Switzerland) Basel	Stade Universitaire, Freiburg
	Poretti (1:2); Poretti (2:2) de Weck (3:4) de Weck (4:4)	Summary	(0:1) Hess (0:2) Hess (2:3) ? (2:4) ? (4:5) ?

12 October 1924 30 years FC Bern	FC Bern (Switzerland)	1 – 0 (Note: 2x 30 Minutes.)	(Switzerland) Basel	Neufeld, Bern
	Wenger (1:0)	Summary		Attendance: 5,000

12 October 1924 30 years FC Bern	Servette (Switzerland)	3 – 0	(Switzerland) Basel	Neufeld, Bern
	Turling (1:0) (2:0) (3:0)	Summary		Attendance: 5,000

2 November 1924 Mid-season	Grasshopper Club (Switzerland)	4–0	(Switzerland) Basel	Heiligfeld, Zürich
13:00	Abegglen (1:0); Abegglen (2:0); Abegglen (3:0); Neuenschwander (4:0)	Summary		Referee: (Switzerland) Blum Zürich

==== Winter break, mid- and end of season ====
1 January 1925 Winter break	Basel (Switzerland)	1–5	(Austria) 1. Simmeringer SC	Landhof, Basel
14:30	Ganter (II) 15' (1:0)	Summary	20' (1:1) (2:1) (3:1) (4:1) (5:1)	Attendance: 1,800; Referee: (Switzerland) Hafner Basel

22 March 1925 Mid-season	Solothurn (Switzerland)	2–1	(Switzerland) Basel	Solothurn
	Goal	Summary	Goal

12 April 1925 Mid-season	HŠK Građanski Zagreb (Kingdom of Yugoslavia)	2–0	(Switzerland) Basel	Građanski Stadium Zagreb
16:30	(pen. 1:0); Mantler (pen. 2:0)	Summary		Attendance: 6,000; Referee: (Kingdom of Yugoslavia) Petrovic

13 April 1925 Mid-season	HŠK Građanski Zagreb (Kingdom of Yugoslavia)	1–0	(Switzerland) Basel	Građanski Stadium Zagreb
16:30	Pasinek 28' (1:0)	Summary		Attendance: 5,000; Referee: (Kingdom of Yugoslavia) Klemen

18 April 1925 Mid-season	SK Rapid Wien (Austria)	5–0	(Switzerland) Basel	Pfarrwiese, Wien
16:00	Wesselik 4' (1:0); Bauer (2:0); Wesselik 56' (3:0); Wesselik 58' (4:0); Kirbes 62' (5:0)	Summary		Attendance: 12,000; Referee: (Austria) Werner

16 May 1925 End of season	Young Boys (Switzerland)	5–1	(Switzerland) Basel	Bern
	Vögeli (I) (1:0); Vögeli (II) (2:0) (3:1) (4:1) (5:1)	Summary	(1:1) Fahr	Referee: (Switzerland) Fritz Beuchat Bern

24 May 1925 End of season	Basel (Switzerland)	0 –1	(England) Tottenham Hotspur	Landhof, Basel
16:00		Summary	30' (0:1) Seed	Attendance: 3,000; Referee: (Switzerland) Hafner Basel

=== Serie A ===
==== Central group results ====
14 September 1924 Round 1	Luzern	0 – 3 FF (Note: Forfeit win for Basel: the game ended 0–1, but Luzern had used an ineligible player.)	Basel	Tribschen, Luzern
		Summary	12' (0:1) Rau	Attendance: 800; Referee: (Switzerland) Acker Zürich
Note: Forfeit win for Basel: the game ended 0–1, but Luzern had used an ineligible player.

28 September 1924 Round 2	Grenchen	0–3	Basel	Stadion Brühl, Grenchen
		Summary	48' (0:1) Breh; 50' (0:2) Breh (0:3) Zorzotti	Attendance: 1,500; Referee: (Switzerland) Edm. Dizerens Lausanne

5 October 1924 Round 3	Basel	0–0	Aarau	Landhof, Basel
13:30		Summary		Attendance: 2,000; Referee: (Switzerland) Koblet Winterthur

26 October 1924 Round 4	Basel	1–0	Concordia Basel	Landhof, Basel
15:00	Breh	Summary		Attendance: 2,000; Referee: (Switzerland) Gremminger Oberwinterthur

16 November 1924 Round 5	Basel	0–2	Young Boys	Landhof, Basel
14:30		Summary	25' (0:1) Vögeli; 75' (0:2) Abplanalp	Attendance: 3,500; Referee: (Switzerland) Koblet Winterthur

30 November 1924 Round 6	Old Boys	0–0	Basel	Stadion Schützenmatte, Basel
14:45		Summary		Attendance: 2,500; Referee: (Switzerland) Gremminger Oberwinterthur

7 December 1924 Round 7	Nordstern Basel	0–1	Basel	Stadion Rankhof, Basel
14:30		Summary	(0:1) Breh	Referee: (Switzerland) Ruegg Thalwil

14 December 1924 Round 8	Concordia Basel	0–0	Basel	Landhof, Basel
14:30		Summary		Attendance: 2,500; Referee: (Switzerland) Edm. Dizerens Lausanne

21 December 1924 Round 9	Basel	0–0	FC Bern	Landhof, Basel
14:30		Summary		Attendance: 2,000; Referee: (Switzerland) Passera La Chaux-de-Fonds

11 January 1925 Round 10	Basel	2–0	Luzern	Landhof, Basel
13:00	Fahr 20' (1:0); Breh (2:0)	Summary		Attendance: 1,800; Referee: (Switzerland) Gremminger Oberwinterthur

20 January 1925 Round 11	Basel	1–0	Nordstern Basel	Landhof, Basel
14:45	Breh (1:0)	Summary		Attendance: 2,500; Referee: (Switzerland) Edm. Dizerens Lausanne

15 February 1924 Round 12	Aarau	4–0	Basel	Stadion Brügglifeld, Aarau
15:00	Hürzeler (II) 51' (1:0); Hürzeler (II) 56' (2:0); Hürzeler (II) 73' (3:0); Hürzeler (II) 81' (4:0)	Summary		Referee: (Switzerland) Ruegg Thalwil

29 March 1925 Round 13	Basel	0–3	Old Boys	Landhof, Basel
15:00		Summary	(0:1) Katz (0:2) Wionsowsky; 87' (pen. 0:3) Katz	Attendance: 2,500; Referee: (Switzerland) Ruegg Thalwil

5 April 1925 Round 14	Young Boys	0–0	Basel	Spitalacker, Bern
		Summary		Referee: (Switzerland) Edm. Dizerens Lausanne

26 April 1925 Round 15	FC Bern	2–1	Basel	Neufeld, Bern
	Motta (1:0); Brand (2:0)	Summary	(2:1) Bielser	Referee: (Switzerland) Edm. Dizerens Lausanne

3 May 1925 Round 16	Basel	3–2	Grenchen	Landhof, Basel
15:00	Breh 5' (1:0); Zorzotti 15' (2:0); Schneider (II) 20' (3:0)	Summary	(3:1) (3:2)	Attendance: 1,500; Referee: (Switzerland) Ruegg Thalwil

==== Central group table ====
Pos	Team	Pld	W	D	L	GF	GA	GD	Pts	Qualification
1	FC Bern	16	9	5	2	25	10	+15	23	Advance to finals
2	Aarau	16	8	4	4	25	17	+8	20	
3	Old Boys	16	7	5	4	33	23	+10	19	
4	Basel	16	7	5	4	15	13	+2	19	
5	Young Boys	16	7	3	6	26	18	+8	17	
6	Nordstern Basel	16	5	4	7	17	13	+4	14	
7	Grenchen	16	4	4	8	17	23	−6	12	
8	Concordia Basel	16	4	4	8	15	25	−10	12	
9	Luzern	16	2	4	10	12	43	−31	8	Relegation play-off

Source: rsssf.com

== See also ==
- History of FC Basel
- List of FC Basel players
- List of FC Basel seasons

== Sources ==
- Rotblau: Jahrbuch Saison 2014/2015. Publisher: FC Basel Marketing AG. ISBN 978-3-7245-2027-6
- Die ersten 125 Jahre. Publisher: Josef Zindel im Friedrich Reinhardt Verlag, Basel. ISBN 978-3-7245-2305-5
- FCB team 1924–25 at fcb-archiv.ch
- Switzerland 1924-25 at RSSSF
