= Trudi Schoop =

Comedian dancer and therapist (1903–1999)

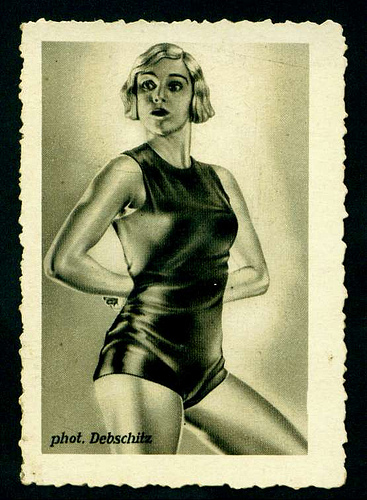
- Born: 1904; Zurich, Switzerland
- Died: July 14, 1999 (aged 94–95); Van Nuys, California, US
- Occupations: Dancer, Comedian and Therapist

Trudi Schoop (October 9, 1904, Zurich, Switzerland – July 14, 1999, Van Nuys, California) was a Swiss dancer who pioneered the treatment of mental illness with dance therapy.

== Life and work ==
Born in Switzerland, the daughter of the editor of the Swiss newspaper Neue Zürcher Zeitung, Her younger sister was Hedi Schoop. Schoop was mostly self-taught, though she did study some ballet and modern dance after she was an established performer. She performed throughout the 1930s and made several tours of the United States, arranged by the impresario Sol Hurok. She made her New York debut at The Majestic Theatre with her "Dancing Comedians" on December 27, 1935. Schoop, the performer, was often referred to as a female Charlie Chaplin. She often toured often under the moniker, "Trudi Schoop and her Dancing Comedians."

Schoop stayed in Switzerland during World War II, and often performed in anti-Fascist cabaret shows. In a tribute article on Schoop, the American Journal of Dance Therapy told of her comic protest performances, "As the Germans marched relentlessly through Europe, her wishful fantasy led her to dance Hitler as the Dying Swan. A black tutu suggested the uniform of the SS and her face was adorned with a mustache. The German consul was outraged, and her own Swiss government was decidedly nervous." She resumed touring after the war, but disbanded her dance company in 1947 and moved to Los Angeles, California to undertake an exploration of dance as therapy for schizophrenic patients.

Among the several California medical institutions where Schoop worked was the Camarillo State Mental Hospital, where she was recommended as a therapist by UCLA neuropsychiatrists who had reviewed her theories. Schoop developed what she called body-ego technique, which used movement to help draw patients out of isolation and help them to respond to, rather than shrink from, human contact.

Schoop impacted countless people and is known as one of the founders of dance/movement therapy, based on the dance/movement therapy created by C.G.Jung in 1916. In Los Angeles she worked together with Tina Keller-Jenny. Many people who studied with her mentioned her sense of humor, warmth, and love. In the 1960s she would collaborate with Dr. Joan Chodorow, a leading dance therapist and pioneer of the Authentic Movement, a unique form of dance therapy.

She died in Van Nuys, California.
