= Joan Chodorow =

Joan Chodorow PhD, LMFT, BC-DMT
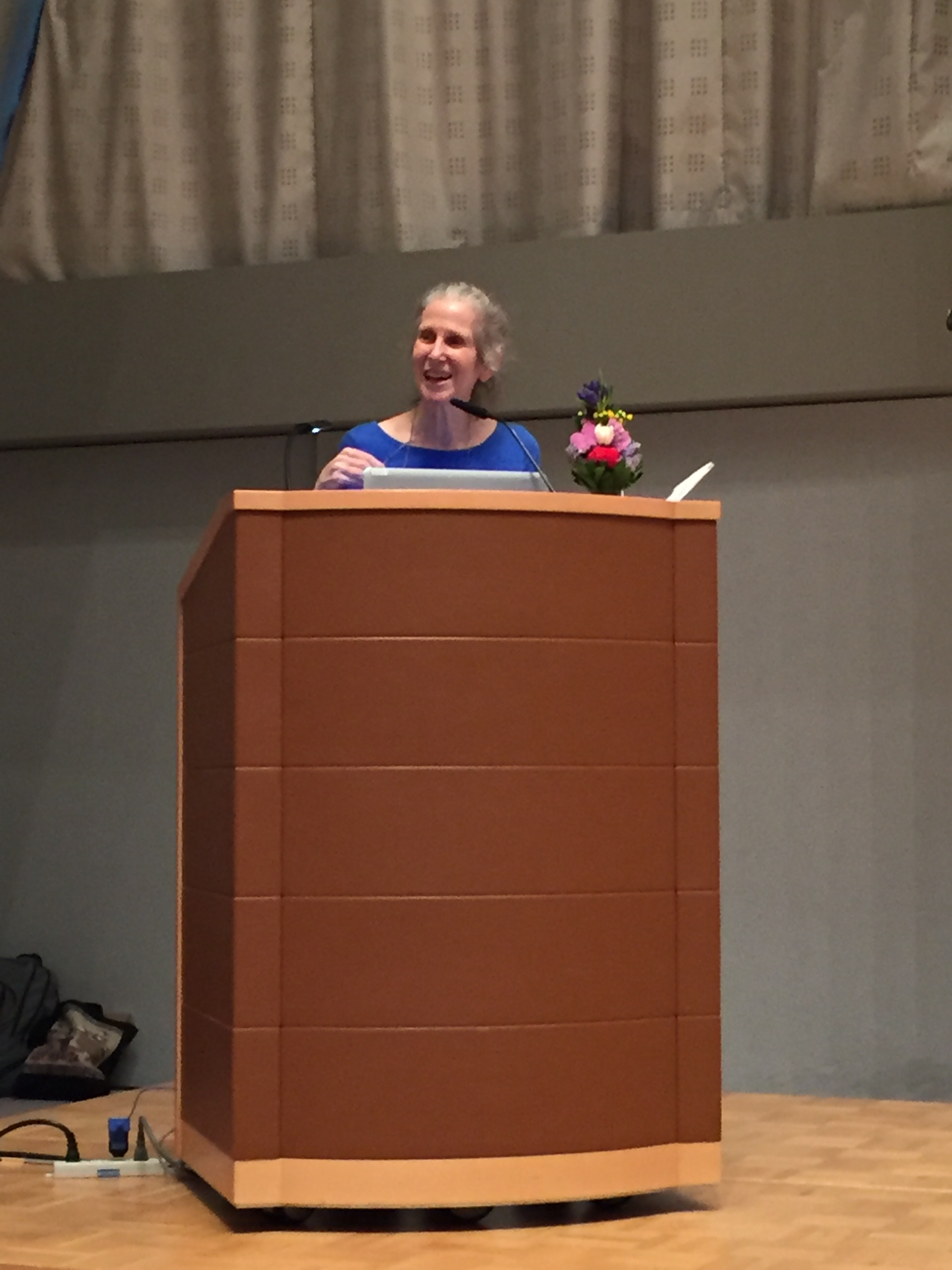
- Chodorow speaking at the International Association for Analytical Psychology Congress at the Kyoto International Conference Center in 2016
- Born: May 29, 1937 (age 89); United States
- Education: PhD in psychology
- Occupations: Dance/movement therapist; Jungian psychoanalyst; Teacher; Scholar; Author
- Known for: Pioneering Authentic Movement and co-developing the Archetypal Affect System
- Notable work: Dance Therapy and Depth Psychology: The Moving Imagination; Jung on Active Imagination
- Spouse(s): Louis H. Stewart, PhD (deceased, 1998)
- Awards: American Dance Therapy Association Lifetime Achievement Award (2009)

Joan Chodorow (born May 29, 1937) is an American dance/movement therapist, Jungian psychoanalyst, international teacher, scholar and author. Chodorow is a Doctor of Philosophy (PhD) in psychology, a licensed marriage and family therapist (LMFT), and an American Dance Therapy Association board-certified dance/movement therapist (BC-DMT).

As a leading pioneer of Active imagination in movement (also known as Authentic Movement or Movement in Depth), she published widely. Her books include Dance therapy and depth psychology: the moving imagination and Jung on Active Imagination. A selection of her articles appear in Authentic movement: essays by Mary Starks Whitehouse, Janet Adler and Joan Chodorow edited by Patrizia Pallaro. Her work has been translated into 20 languages, including Bulgarian, Czech, Danish, Dutch, French, German, Hebrew, Italian, Japanese, Korean, Mandarin, Polish, Russian, and Spanish.

She was the co-developer of the Archetypal Affect System, with her late husband, Jungian psychoanalyst Dr. Louis H. Stewart, and his brother, child psychiatrist Dr. Charles T. Stewart.

In 1999, Chodorow was selected to present the Marian Chace Foundation Lecture for the American Dance Therapy Association (ADTA). In 2009, she received the American Dance Therapy Association Lifetime Achievement Award.

== Early life ==
Joan Chodorow was born on May 29, 1937 in New York City. She was born to a Jewish family, the only child of Ukrainian sculptor and painter Eugene Chodorow, and American journalist Lily Chodorow. In 1941, they moved together to Southern California. Chodorow credits her childhood playing on a trapeze in her backyard and dancing in a "magic circle" during Jane Denham's dance classes as her earliest experiences of imaginative expression through movement. These experiences led her to understand more about the body/psyche connection and its essential role in healing and growth.

As a young adult, Chodorow danced professionally but felt unsatisfied by the emphasis on performance. Seeking to find more meaning in her work, she chose to shift her career to teaching dance classes to children at and managing the Community Dance Studio in Los Angeles, California. While there, she collaborated with Ethel Young, the director of Heights Cooperative Nursery School, to develop a way of using the arts in core curriculum for early childhood education; aspects of their collaboration were later used in the development of Head Start.

== Career ==
=== Dance/movement therapy ===
Emerging from her work teaching children at the Community Dance Studio, in 1962 Joan was hired to teach dance to children with autism at the psychiatric unit in County Hospital in Los Angeles, California, thus beginning her career as a dance/movement therapist. That year, she also began analysis with Kate Marcus, one of the founding members of what became the C.G. Jung Institute of Los Angeles. Chodorow later led individual and group movement therapy sessions with adults at Cottage General Hospital in Santa Barbara, California.

In her early career, she studied and collaborated with dance and movement therapists Trudi Schoop, a world-renowned dancer and mime, and Mary Starks Whitehouse, the founding pioneer of Authentic Movement. Authentic Movement is a completely self-directed form of dance/movement therapy rooted in C.G. Jung's depth psychology. In this embodied practice, individuals discover a bridge between the conscious and the unconscious through natural movement in the presence of a compassionate witness.

Chodorow also studied with Irmgard Bartenieff, a dancer, choreographer, and theorist who developed new possibilities in movement training, and Alma Hawkins, a pioneer in dance education who founded the United States' first dance department at the University of California, Los Angeles. These early collaborations informed Chodorow's clinical practice, and led to her ongoing research, teaching, and writing on the body-psyche relationship, especially the emotions and their multi-sensory expression and transformation.

=== Jungian analysis ===
Chodorow became an analyst in 1983, having received her Diploma in Analytical Psychology from the C.G. Jung Institute of Los Angeles after years of study. As a Jungian analyst and Authentic Movement teacher and practitioner, she was especially interested in C. G. Jung's map of the soul, the active imagination process, and the experience of the living body. Her work as an analyst in private practice for over four decades integrated these theories.

=== Teaching ===
Together with Dr. Janet Adler and Dr. Louis H. Stewart, Chodorow was among the founding faculty of the Authentic Movement Institute (AMI) in Berkeley, California. AMI (1993–2004) was co-founded by dance/movement therapist Neala Haze and dance/movement therapist and Jungian analyst Dr. Tina Stromsted. Chodorow's teaching contributions included formal courses, private workshops, intensive seminars, and international conferences, including the International Association for Analytical Psychology (IAAP) Congresses.

=== Leadership ===
In 2000, Joan invited Jungian analyst colleagues who engaged the body in analytic work to join her in presenting at a conference where they explored embodied experience and movement with a large group of conference participants. These colleagues included Marion Woodman, Anita Greene, Wendy Wyman-McGinty, and others.

==== American Dance Therapy Association ====
Chodorow is a professional member of the American Dance Therapy Association (ADTA), where she was president from 1974 to 1976, and served as keynote speaker in 1983 and 1991. She presented the Marian Chace Foundation Lecture in 1999 and received the ADTA Lifetime Achievement Award in 2009.

==== International Association for Analytical Psychology ====
In 2001, Chodorow invited an experienced teaching team – including Marion Woodman, Anita Greene, Wendy Wyman-McGinty, and others – to facilitate day-long workshops in Active Imagination in Movement for participants at the 15th International Congress for Analytical Psychology hosted by the International Association for Analytical Psychology (IAAP). In those workshops, she and her co-leaders offered opportunities for analysts and candidates to learn about and practice how to integrate embodiment with Jungian analysis and psychotherapy. Chodorow continued to chair these day-long Pre-Congress workshops for more than two decades.

She was featured in the IAAP's January 2025 news bulletin.

== Education ==
Chodorow received her master of arts in psychology with a specialization in dance therapy from Goddard College. She received her diploma in analytical psychology from the C.G. Jung Institute of Los Angeles in 1983. She became a doctor of philosophy in psychology via the Union Graduate School.

== Collaboration with Louis H. Stewart ==
Chodorow met Jungian psychoanalyst Louis H. Stewart, PhD, in 1982; they married in 1985. Joan and Louis frequently collaborated together as teaching partners in the United States and abroad, including an annual summer course in Switzerland. Louis was a founding member, former president, and training analyst at the C. G. Jung Institute of San Francisco. He received his PhD in clinical psychology at the University of California, Berkeley and was a professor of medical psychology at the University of California, San Francisco (UCSF) and of psychology at San Francisco State University.

=== The Archetypal Affect System ===
Together with Louis' brother Charles T. Stewart, MD, a child psychiatrist, Chodorow and Stewart developed the Archetypal Affect System. Their work addresses human motivation and development, emotions, embodied consciousness, relationship styles, and creation myths. Building on Jung's model of the psyche and the relationship between affect and archetype, they integrated findings from Joseph Henderson, Charles Darwin, Silvan Tompkins, Paul Eckman, D.H. Winnicott, Mary Main, and others to demonstrate how play and imagination are crucial for psychological growth. In the 1980s, when the field of psychology was shifting from a focus on behavior to cognition, they developed their theory on how emotion was central to healing and development. Their research demonstrated that active imagination is as fundamental for adult individuation as imaginative play is for children.

== Selected quotes ==
"The roots of [the work of the American Dance Therapy Association] can be traced to earliest human history when disease was seen as a loss of soul and dance was an integral part of the healing ritual." – Dr Joan Chodorow.

"Children develop a sense of who they are through symbolic play. As adults, we do the same thing but call it creative imagination. Any in-depth approach to psychotherapy helps us develop a sense of who we are through the imagination. In a sense, active or creative imagination is play – play with images. All of us have ways of giving form to the imagination, and for some of us it has to be through the body. Some of us imagine best through our bodies." – Dr Joan Chodorow.
