= Jenny Estate =

Manor building in Thalwil, Zürich, Switzerland

Coordinates: 47°17′31″N 8°33′58″E

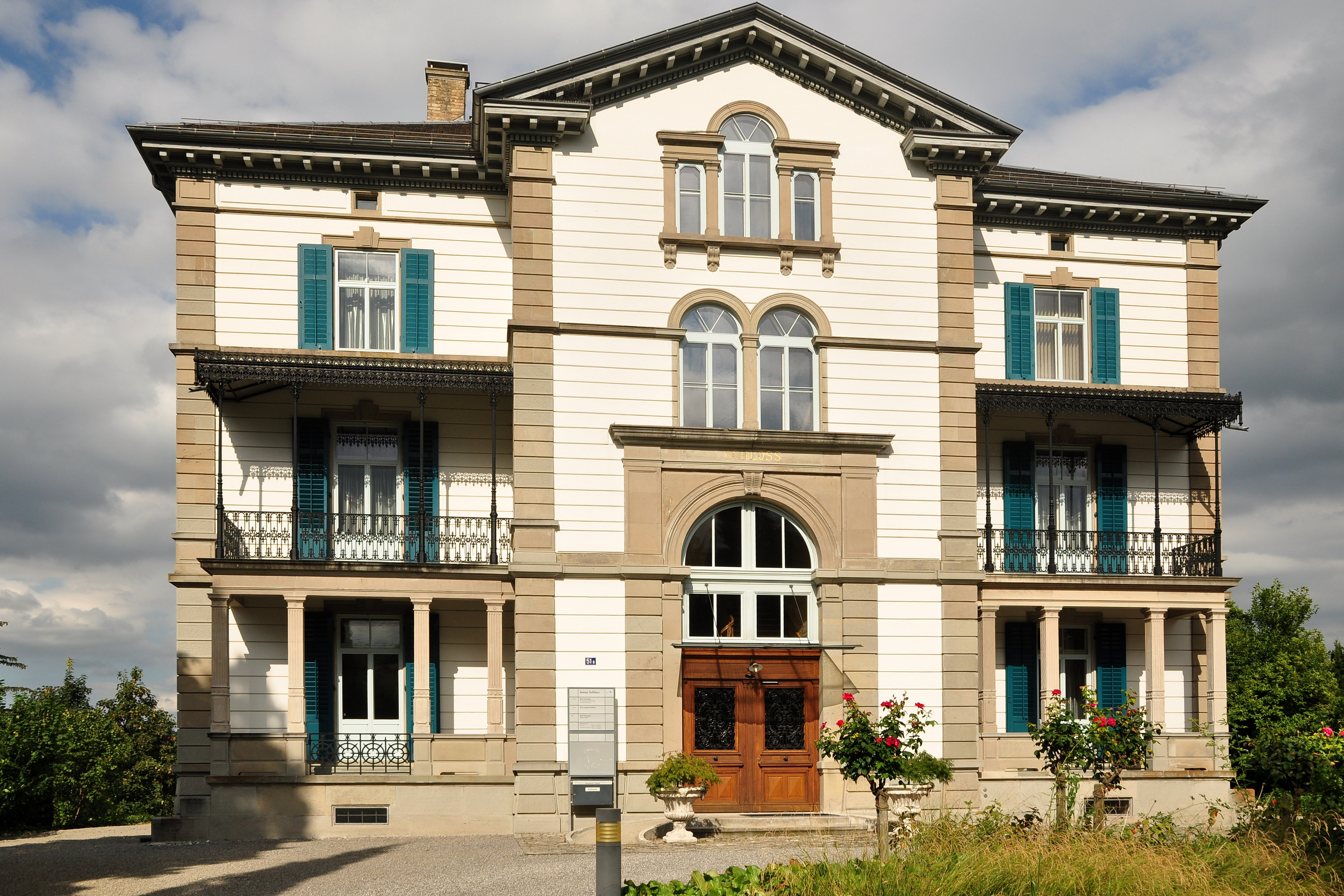
Jenny Estate

Jenny Estate (German: Jenny Schloss) is a large estate in the municipality of Thalwil of the Canton of Zurich in Switzerland. It is a Swiss heritage site of national significance.

== History ==
The building, now known as Jenny Estate, was built in 1878 as a home and silk fabric factory for Fritz Schwarzenbach-Suter. It was designed by architect Jakob Staub (1837-1892) and Johann Rudolf Hofmann-Schmid. Merchant Conrad Jenny Blumer (1848-1928), married to Albertina Jenny, bought the building from Schwarzenbach's heirs in 1893. Since then it was popularly referred to as the "Jenny Castle".The decorative paintings in the staircase are by Eugen Ott (1850-1916) and the Jenny coat of arms decorates the master bedroom.1928 it became the home of son and author Hans Jenny (1894-1942) who is best known for his book Kunstführer der Schweiz (Art and architecture of Switzerland) (1934). It was acquired by the municipality and then renovated in 1986–93. One of the outbuildings is now used as a kindergarten.

== Personalities ==
Beside Hans Jenny, some other members of his family made a name of themselves. His sister Tina Keller-Jenny was a known Psychotherapist, and one of the first clients of Swiss psychiatrist and psychoanalyst Carl Jung. She was married to the theologian Adolf Keller, a close friend of Sigmund Freud. Sister Elisabeth Alice Jenny was married to the politician and founder of the Orchester de la Suisse Romande, Paul Lachenal (1884-1955). Son Caspar Konrad Jenny-Caflisch (1888-1944), was a Swiss ambassador in Buenos Aires.
