= Tina Keller-Jenny =

Swiss physician and Jungian psychoanalyst (1887-1985)

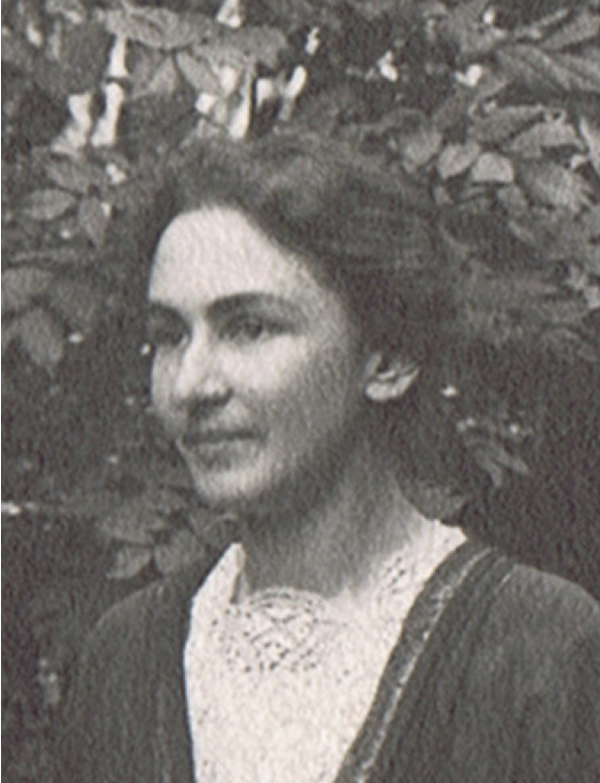
- Born: 17 June 1887; Zurich
- Died: 25 October 1985 (aged 98)
- Occupations: Physician and Jungian Psychotherapist
- Known for: Pioneer in integrating analysis with body-based approaches such as movement and dance. Tina Keller was one of the first women in Switzerland to found a psychiatric Jungian practice
- Notable work: Aus meinen Errinnerungen an C.G.Jung Zur Psyche der Frau
- Spouse: Adolf Keller

Tina Keller-Jenny (born 17 June 1887 in Schwanden, Switzerland; died 25 October 1985 in Geneva) was a Swiss physician and Jungian psychotherapist who witnessed firsthand the development of analytical psychology during its formative years.

== Biography ==
Tina Keller was the daughter of Swiss industrialist Conrad Jenny, and grew up at the Jenny-Castle, in Thalwil, Switzerland. In 1912 she married the theologian Adolf Keller and was mother of five children. Tina Keller completed many years of analysis with C.G.Jung and Toni Wolff (1915–1928), who discovered movement as active imagination. She completed medical school in 1931, and practiced as a psychiatrist and Jungian-oriented psychotherapist. She was one of the first women in Switzerland to found a psychiatric Jungian practice. Keller-Jenny was one of the pioneers in integrating analysis with body-based approaches such as movement and dance, which has since become a major element in the field of body-sensitive analysis. A Therapy largely unknown until the 1950s when rediscovered by Marian Chace and therapist Mary Whitehouse. Whitehouse later became a dancer and dance teacher having studied with Martha Graham and Mary Wigma.

After the death of her husband Adolf Keller in 1963, Tina Keller worked in a psychiatric hospital in Los Angeles together with Trudi Schoop. Schoop was a dance therapist, dancer and comedian. Back in Switzerland, she was asked to speak on the 10th anniversary of C.G.Jung death. She was by then the last surviving collaborators of C.G.Jung's early years. Until her old age, Tina Keller made therapies, including her grandnephew and painter Daniel Garbade. She wrote books and theses, and died 98 years old in 1985 in Geneva.

== Literature ==
- Tina Keller & Wendy K. Swan: The memoir of Tina Keller-Jenny. A Lifelong Confrontation with the Psychology of C. G. Jung. Spring Journal Books, New Orleans 2009, ISBN 978-18-826-7085-7, OCLC 779060366.
- [notice biographique, correspondance]. s. n., s. l., 1933–1945, OCLC 716739683.
- Tina Keller, Aus meinen Erinnerungen an C. G. Jung. Bircher Benner, Erlenbach 1980.
- Tina Keller, Zur Psyche der Frau. Classen, Zurich 1955.
- Tina Keller, Das Ja zu sich selber. Bircher Benner, Erlenbach 1980.
- Marianne Jehle-Wildberger: C. G. Jung und Adolf Keller. Über Theologie und Psychologie. Briefe und Gespräche. Theologischer Verlag, Zürich 2014, ISBN 978-3-290-17770-6, OCLC 992952828.
- Sonu Shamdasani: Introduction to Jungian Psychology. Princeton University Press, Princeton 2012.
- Schweizerisches medizinisches Jahrbuch. Schwabe, Basel 1980.
