= Emil Breh =

Swiss footballer

Personal information
- Full name: Emil Breh
- Position: Forward

Senior career*
Years	Team	Apps	(Gls)
1924–1925	FC Basel	15	(7)
- * Club domestic league appearances and goals

Emil Breh was a footballer who played as a forward.

Breh joined FC Basel in the summer of 1924. He played for the team in their 1924–25 season and during that season he played a total of 23 games scoring seven goals; 15 of these games were in the Swiss Serie A and the other eight were friendly games. All the goals were scored in the domestic league and Breh was the team's top goal scorer.

Breh played his first league game for the club in the second game of the 1924–25 Serie A season on 28 September 1924 in the away game against Grenchen. He scored his first two league goals in the same game and Basel won by three goals to nil. His last game for the club was also against Grenchen, a home game at the Landhof on 3 March 1925, that Basel won 3–2.

== Sources ==
- Rotblau: Jahrbuch Saison 2017/2018. Publisher: FC Basel Marketing AG. ISBN 978-3-7245-2189-1
- Die ersten 125 Jahre. Publisher: Josef Zindel im Friedrich Reinhardt Verlag, Basel. ISBN 978-3-7245-2305-5
- Verein "Basler Fussballarchiv" Homepage
