= Hedi Schoop =

German dancer, cabaret artist, sculptor, painter and manufacturer (1906–1995)

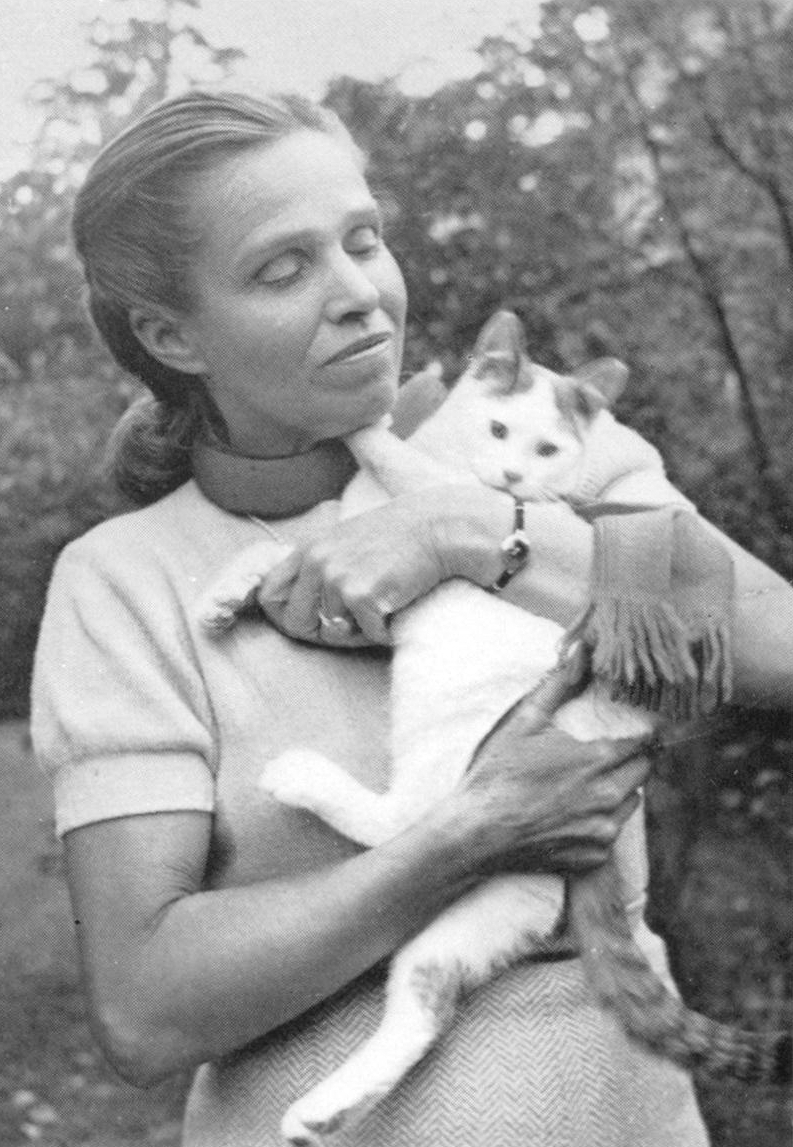
- Hedi Schoop in 1957
- Born: Hedwig Schoop; 3 April 1906; Zürich, Switzerland
- Died: 14 April 1995 (aged 89); Van Nuys, California, U.S.
- Occupations: Dancer; Cabaret artist; Sculptor; Painter
- Spouses: Friedrich Hollaender; Ernő Verebes

Hedi Schoop (3 April 1906 – 14 April 1995) was a Swiss-born German dancer, cabaret artist, sculptor and painter. From 1929 to 1933, she appeared in Berlin in the cabarets Die Katakombe and Tingel-Tangel-Theater. She emigrated with her first husband, Friedrich Hollaender, to California, where she turned to pottery. She founded a factory where ceramics based on her designs were produced from 1940 to 1958.

== Life ==
Hedwig "Hedi" Schoop was born in Zürich on 3 April 1906, the daughter of Friedrich Maximilian Schoop (1871–1924) and Emma Olga Schoop, née Böppli (1873–1959). Her grandfather Ulrich Schoop was a lecturer at the Kunstgewerbeschule in Zürich. Her father was a journalist, including for the Zürcher Post, and president of the Grand Hotel Dolder. The family lived at the Zürichberg, where the hotel was also located.

Schoop was the third of four children, the first being the painter Max Schoop, the second the dancer Trudi Schoop, and the youngest the composer Paul Schoop. The parents nurtured the artistic interests of their children. Trudi and Hedi received drama instruction. Schoop studied sculpture, architecture, painting and fashion design at the Kunstgewerbeschule Wien and the Reimann School in Berlin. She probably learned dancing from her sister who opened a dance school in Zürich in 1924.

When Werner Finck and Hans Deppe founded the cabaret Die Katakombe in Berlin on 16 October 1929, the ensemble also included the actor Theo Lingen, the dancers Trudi and Hedi Schoop, and the artist Erich Ohser. Hedi Schoop appeared in parody pantomime, sometimes as a grotesque duo with her sister.

When the cabaret dissolved in 1930, Schoop turned to Friedrich Hollaender's Tingel-Tangel-Theater, which opened on 7 January 1931. A guest of their first program was Marlene Dietrich, who had become famous singing Hollaender's songs, including "Ich bin von Kopf bis Fuß auf Liebe eingestellt". The December 1931 show Allez-Hopp! was reviewed by Alfred Polgar in Die Weltbühne, who wrote about her ability to present with a "trinity" of temperament, drollery and grace ("Dreieinigkeit von Temperament, Drolligkeit und Grazie"), lively physical humour ("lebhaftem körperlichem Witz") and biting parody ("saftig im Parodistischen").

In 1932, Hollaender and Schoop married. Hollaender left the cabaret in January 1933, due to the Nazi regime, which closed it in 1935. The couple emigrated via Paris to the United States, where Hollaender had a contract for three months with 20th Century Fox. They lived in Hollywood and later in Hollywood Hills. They tried to run a cabaret in English, Tingel-Tangel-Theater, beginning on 3 May 1934 with a program Allez-Hopp! based on the former show. It was initially well attended, but the attendance began to decline. When Hollaender received a contract with RKO to produce a Western and compose the film score for it, he closed the cabaret.

=== Hedi Schoop Art Creations ===
From 1935, Schoop turned to artistic work. She first modeled puppets and dressed them. When they were displayed by Barker Bros., she was advised to turn to more durable materials and began to produce ceramics. In 1940, she opened a production line, Hedi Schoop Art Creations. Schoop created ceramics for practical use, such as flower pots and candle holders. Figures were often rural people in national costumes, in simple design which carried coloring. She also created bowls and lamps, among other items, sometimes in series aimed at collectors. Schoop hired people for the production but kept the designing for herself. In the late 1940s, the company had more than 50 employees and produced more than 30,000 pieces. She employed other foreigners, including the journalist Ferdinand Kahn, the actor Ernő Verebes, the artist Sylvester Schäffer, the dancer Gitta Wallerstein, the actress Illa Rhoden and the cabaret artist Trude Berliner.

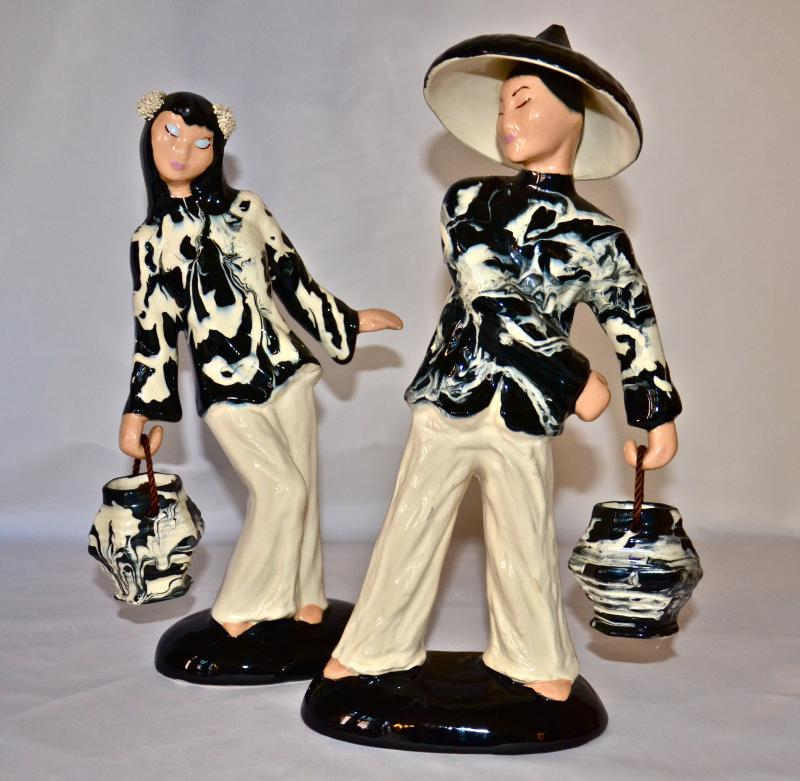
Oriental figurines

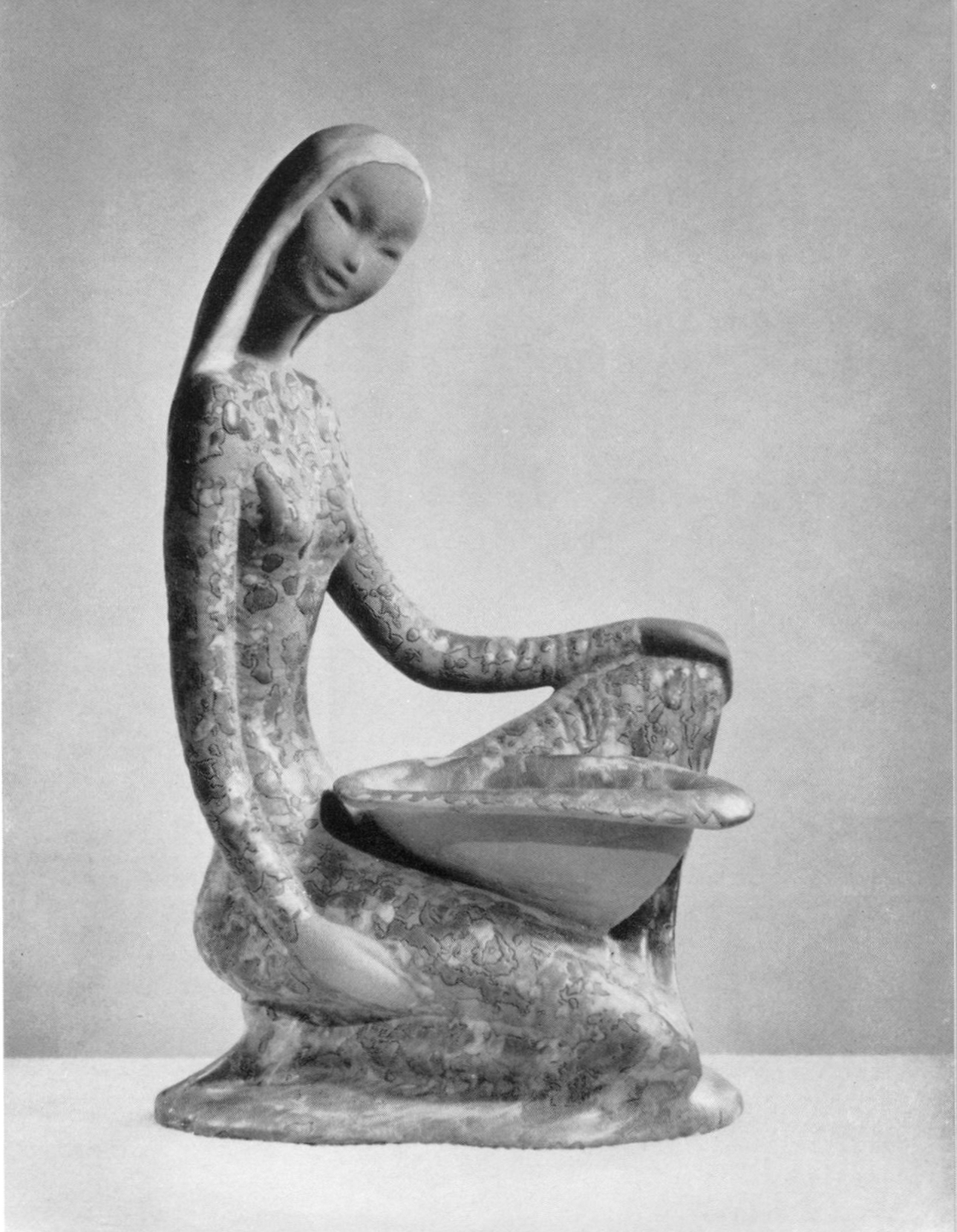
Ruhe

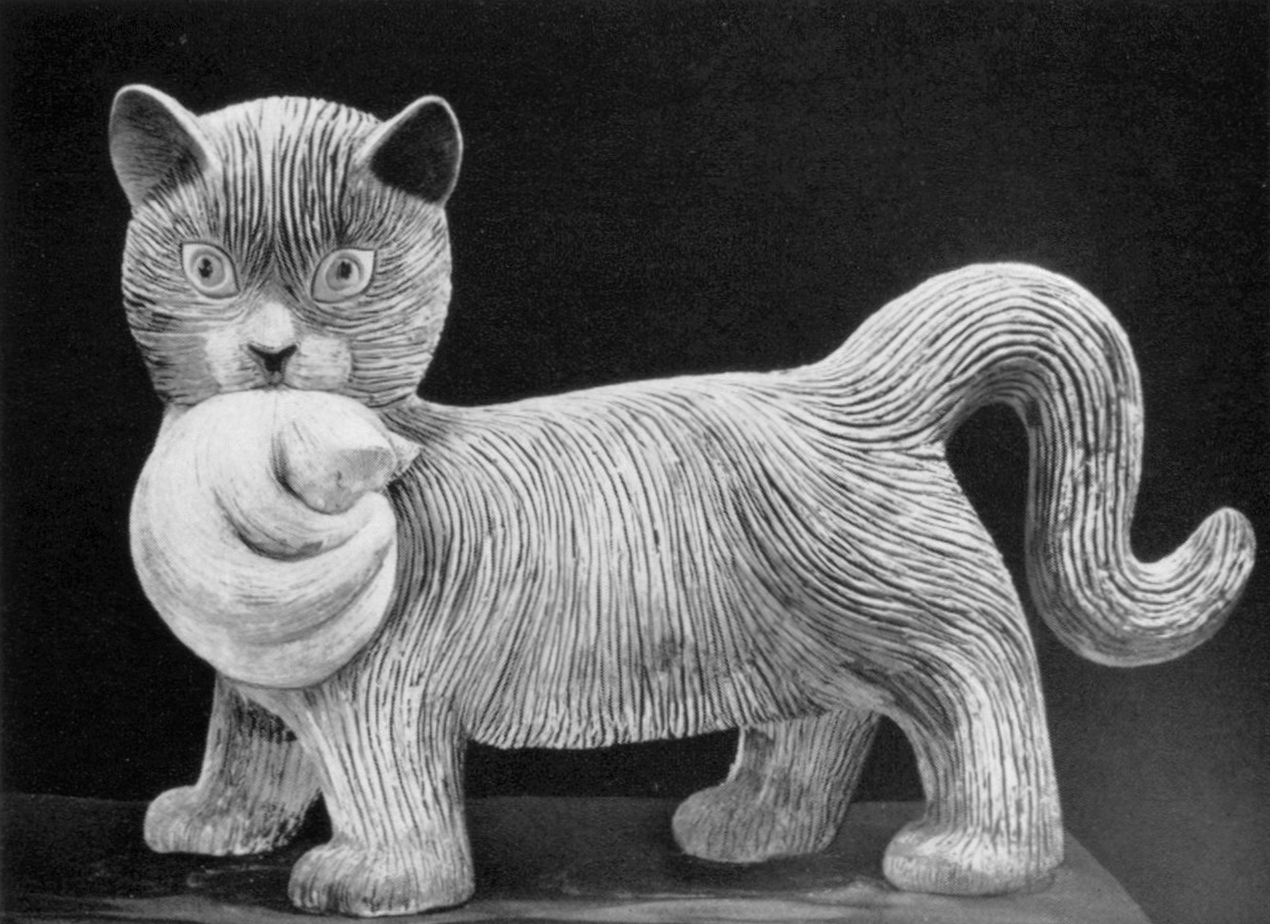
Katzenmutter

In 1943, Schoop married Ernő Verebes. They had a son, Tony (Anthony) Verebes, in 1946, who became a photographer. The couple lived in Van Nuys. In 1974, Schoop illustrated a book by her sister Trudi, Won’t you join the dance? Schoop died in Van Nuys on 14 or 15 April 1995.
