= Thalwil =

- Municipality
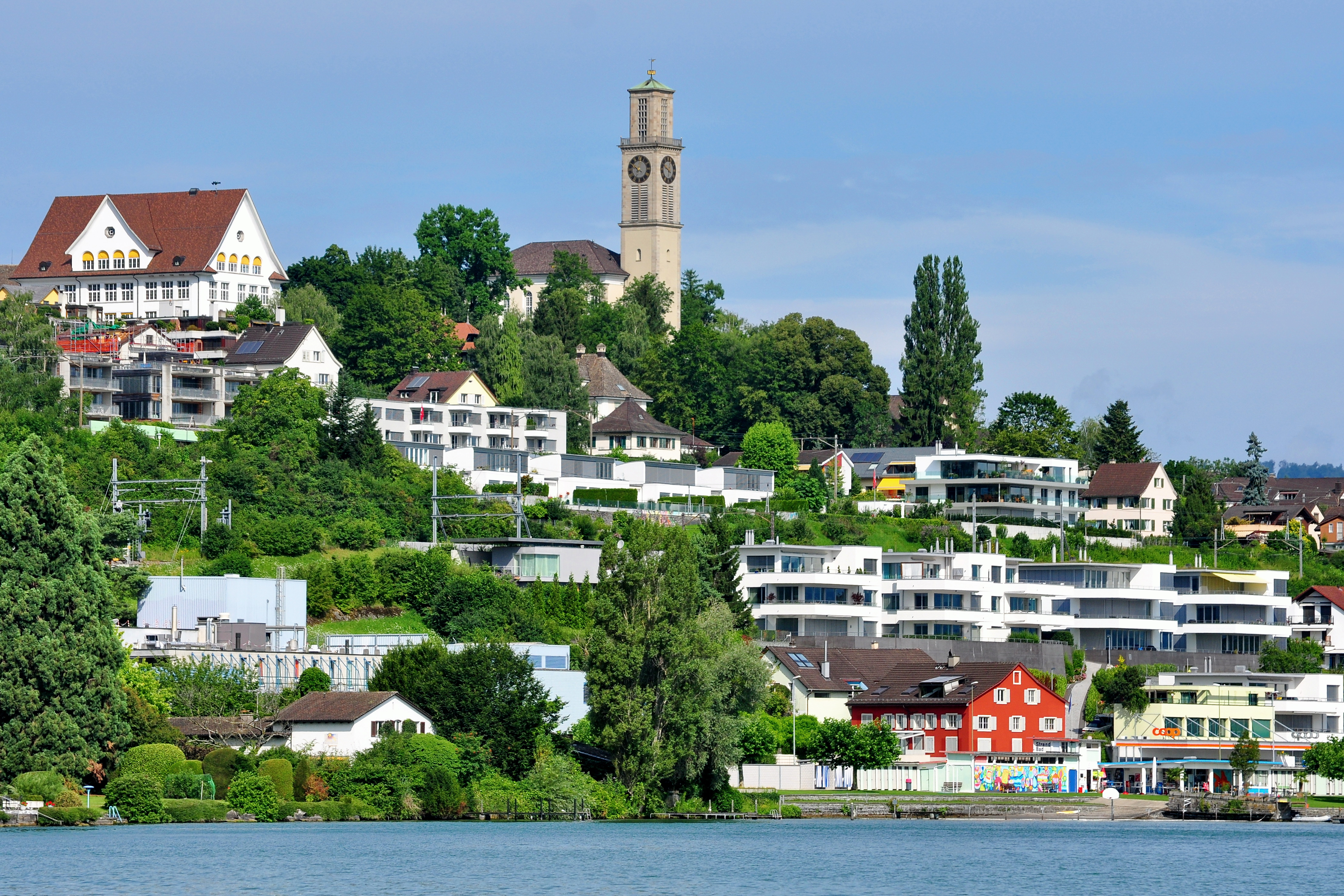

- Flag Coat of arms
- Location of Thalwil
- Location within Switzerland Location within Canton of Zurich
- Coordinates: 47°17′N 8°34′E
- Country: Switzerland
- Canton: Zurich
- District: Horgen

Government
  - Mayor: Gemeindepräsident; Hansruedi Kölliker FDP/PRD (as of 2022)

Area
  - Total: 5.53 km^{2} (2.14 sq mi)
- Elevation: 486 m (1,594 ft)

Population (December 2020)
  - Total: 18,278
  - Density: 3,310/km^{2} (8,560/sq mi)
- Time zone: UTC+01:00 (CET)
  - Summer (DST): UTC+02:00 (CEST)
- Postal code: 8800
- SFOS number: 141
- ISO 3166 code: CH-ZH
- Surrounded by: Erlenbach, Herrliberg, Horgen, Küsnacht, Langnau am Albis, Oberrieden, Rüschlikon
- Twin towns: La Tour-de-Peilz (Switzerland)
- Website: www.thalwil.ch

Thalwil is a municipality and town in the district of Horgen in the canton of Zürich in Switzerland. The municipality includes two parts: Thalwil and Gattikon.

== History ==
Thalwil is first mentioned around 1030 as Talwile villam, which is derived from Tellewilare, Tello's Farm, and indicates the early medieval origins of Thalwil as an Alemannic farmstead. Only a few graves remain from this period. In 1133, it was mentioned as Telwil.

The parish of Thalwil originally comprised four Wachten (hamlets):

- Ludretikon, the oldest hamlet (mentioned in 915), bordering Rüschlikon
- Oberdorf (Upper Village), the area around the church
- Unterdorf (Lower Village), the area roughly south of the railway station
- Langnau, which separated from Thalwil around 1713

In medieval times, the economy consisted mainly of farms, vineyards as well as a small amount of fishing, crafts and shipping (on the lake). This estate was once owned by the Dukes of Habsburg and held by the Barons of Eschenbach. The Abbeys of Muri and Wettingen also had significant interests and owned 12 and 3 farms respectively.

Thalwil also boasts the oldest wood corporation in the Canton of Zurich, the Bannegg-Waldung. It was first mentioned in 1483, when Muri Abbey granted it to the twelve beneficiaries of the Abbey farms in Thalwil. Today the corporation is owned by 16 members as well as by the Thalwil Gemeinde.

== Geography ==
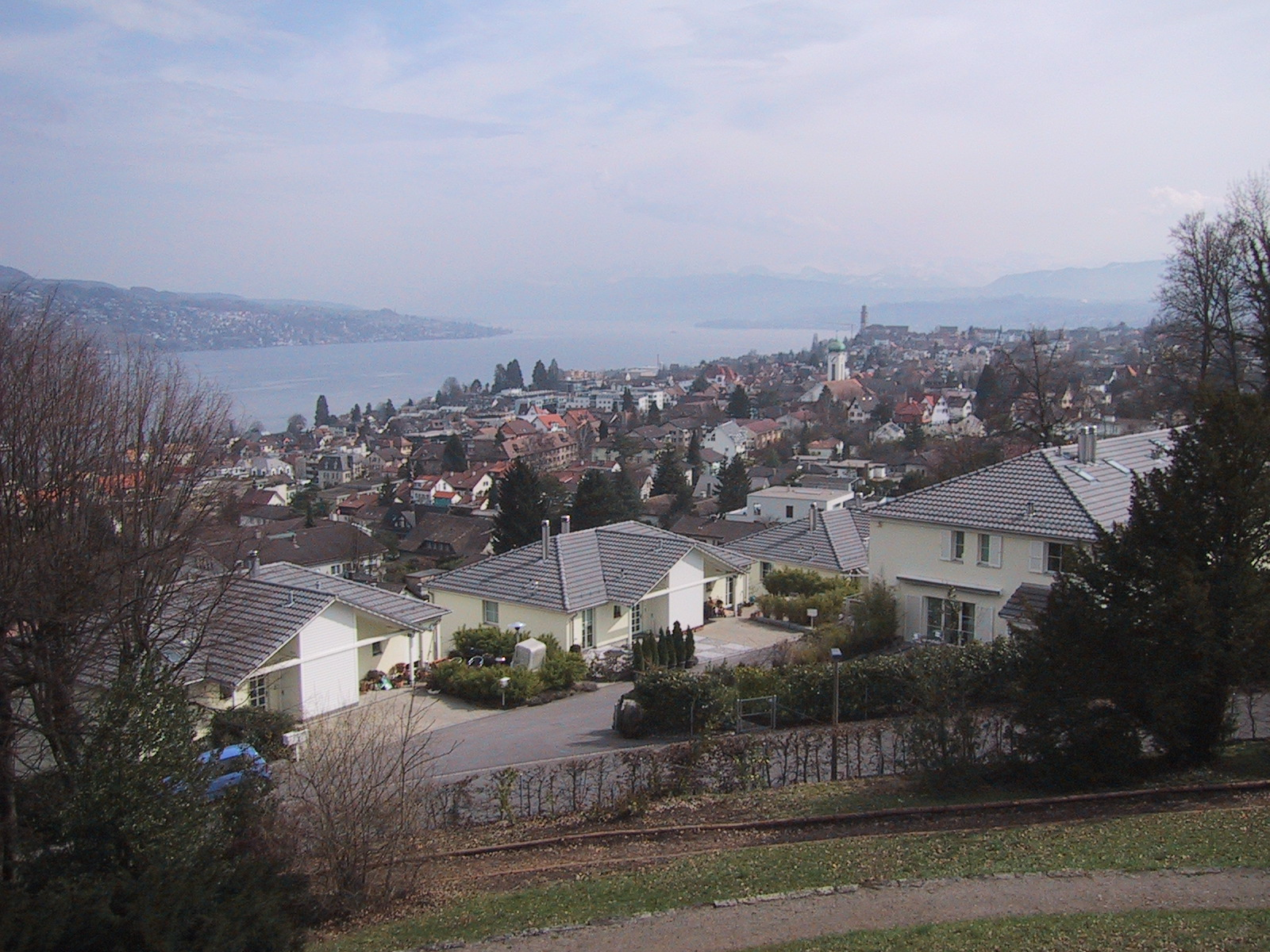
Thalwil and Lake Zurich

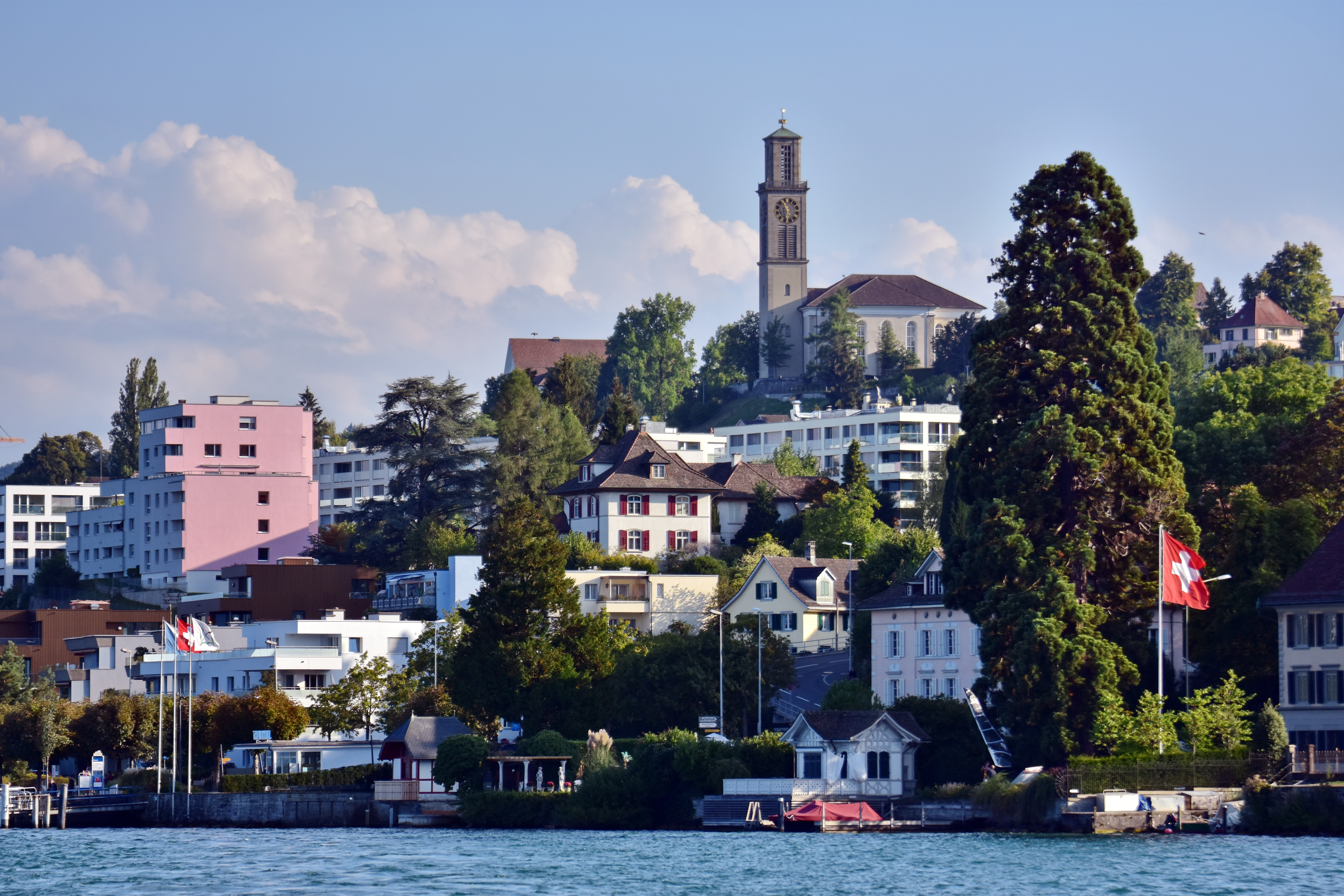
Thalwil seen from Lake Zurich

Aerial view (1963)

The municipality of Thalwil is located on the Zimmerberg ridge between the western shore of Lake Zurich and the Sihl river. It includes the town of Thalwil, on the eastern slopes of the ridge alongside the lake, and the village of Gattikon, on the westen slopes and the bank of the Sihl. Thalwil borders on the communes of Rüschlikon, Langnau am Albis, Oberrieden, Horgen and (across the lake) Erlenbach.

The municipality has an area of 5.5 km^{2} (2.1 sq mi). Of this area, 18% is used for agricultural purposes, while 23.8% is forested. Of the rest of the land, 56.1% is settled (buildings or roads) and the remainder (2.2%) is non-productive (rivers, glaciers or mountains). In 1996 housing and buildings made up 42.3% of the total area, while transportation infrastructure made up the rest (13.7%). Of the total unproductive area, water (streams and lakes) made up 1.4% of the area. As of 2007 51.3% of the total municipal area was undergoing some type of construction.

== Coat of arms ==
The Gemeindewappen (communal flag or coat of arms) consists of two diagonally crossed black bulrushes with green stems and leaves on a white background.

== Demographics ==
Thalwil has a population of 18’805 (as of 2025). As of 2025, 31.4% of the population was made up of foreign nationals. More accurate and detailed information about the population can be found online: Zürcher Gemeinden in Zahlen | Kanton Zürich

The historical population is given in the following table:

year	population
1634	601
1762	1,100
1799	1,149
1833	1,318
1850	1,889
1880	3,293
1900	6,791
1950	8,787
1990	15,647
2000	15,749
2010	17,189
2020	18,263
2023	18,550
2024	18’487

=== Local Council ===
The municipal council is the executive body. The Thalwil municipal council consists of nine members, including the president. The municipal clerk supports and relieves the municipal council at the strategic level. He manages the municipal council office.

The following municipal council members were elected for the 2026-2030 legislature:

Kölliker Hansruedi	Municipal President	Head of Präsidiales
Loss Davide	1st Vice President	Head of Gesellschaft und Sicherheit
Schmidlin Adrian	2nd Vice President	Head of Liegenschaften
Böni Erika	local council member	Head of Soziales
Brüllmann David	local council member	Head of Tiefbau und Infrastruktur
Kling Christian	local council member	Head of Umwelt und Nachhaltigkeit
Kristokat Anne-Marie	local council member	Head of Hochbau und Entwicklung
Henauer Thomas	local council member	Head of Finanzen
Hunziker Thomas	local council member	School President
Kuster Pascal	Municipal clerk	

=== Election results ===
In the 2023 National Council elections, the voter shares in Thalwil were: SVP 23.72 % (+1.38), FDP 18.55 % (-1.77), SP 17.95 % (+2.77), glp 14.26 % (-2.59), Mitte 11.08 % (+3.23), Greens 7.81 % (-3.43), EVP 2.60 % (-0.58), EDU 0.73 (-0.02).

=== Town twinning ===
In June 2023, the municipal assembly decided in favor of the sponsorship with the Grisons municipality of Albula / Alvra, which consists of seven fractions. The municipality of Thalwil supports Albula / Alvra with an annual contribution of up to CHF 100,000. The Graubünden municipality of Val Müstair was Thalwil's sponsoring municipality until 2023.

=== Churches in Thalwil ===
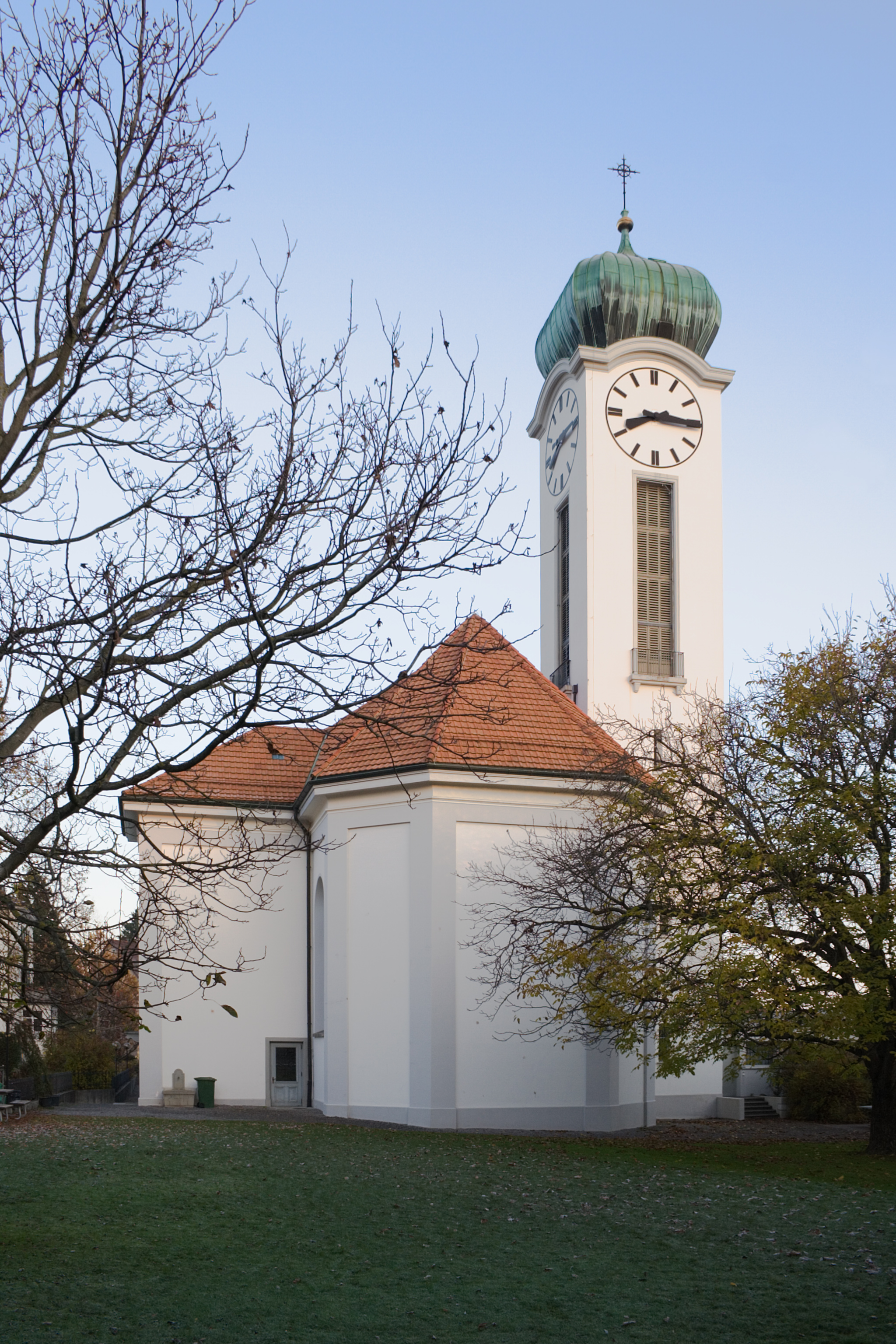
Roman Catholic church

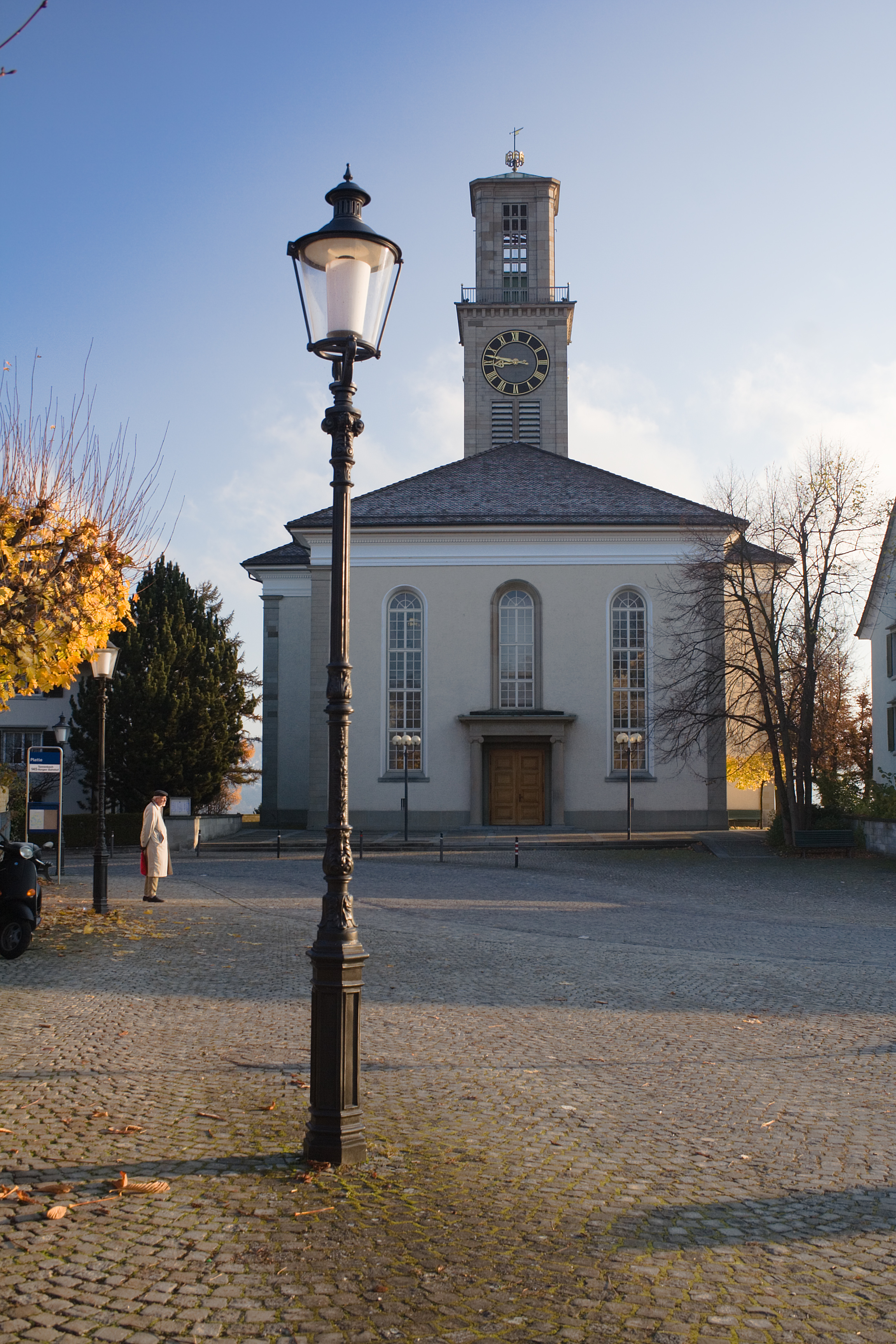
Protestant church

Thalwil is one of the oldest parishes on the shores of Lake Zurich, with the Platte affording views of the lake and its surroundings from Zurich to the Alps.

The earliest recorded church was dedicated to St Martin in 1159. In medieval times it was a dependency of Wettingen Abbey. Although it was frequently hit by lightning and also looted and set on fire during the Old Zürich War (Alter Zürichkrieg), the original building survived for over six hundred years.

In 1845, the small and rather dilapidated chapel was demolished and replaced by a much larger church designed by Ferdinand Stadler. A fire set off during repairs on the tower burnt down the new church almost 100 years later (1943) but the building was soon completely restored and has survived to this day.

As of 2008, there were 5382 Catholics and 5881 Protestants in Thalwil. In the 2000 census, religion was broken down into several smaller categories. From the census, 41.5% were some type of Protestant, with 39.3% belonging to the Swiss Reformed Church and 2.2% belonging to other Protestant churches. 34.3% of the population were Catholic. Of the rest of the population, 3.8% were Muslim, 5.8% belonged to another religion (not listed), 2.6% did not give a religion, and 15% were atheist or agnostic.

=== Industrialisation ===
In the late 1830s, the lakeside road (Seestrasse) was opened. It soon attracted large silk, cotton and other textile factories to the former farming village, some run by local families such as Schwarzenbach, Schmid, and Kölliker. This growth was boosted by the new railway lines from Zurich to Pfäffikon (1875) and Zug (1897). Industrialisation brought new workers into the former farming village and increased the population from 1,318 (in 1833) to 6,791 (in 1900).

As of 2020, Thalwil has an unemployment rate of 3.1%. As of 2018, there were 5 people employed in the primary economic sector and 2 businesses involved in this sector. 1,001 people are employed in the secondary sector and there are 106 businesses in this sector. 5,576 people are employed in the tertiary sector, with 1,193 businesses in this sector. As of 2007, 28.6% of the working population were employed full-time, and 71.4% were employed part-time.

=== Taxes ===
According to the statistical office of Canton Zurich, Thalwil receives 92.0 million Franc in tax revenue every year, as of 2020. 11,022 people pay taxes to Thalwil.

=== Modern-day Thalwil ===
Today this industrial past has all but vanished. The economy of Thalwil is mainly supported by a variety of small and medium-sized businesses, many located in the Böni commercial estate opened in 1971. This includes Unisys Switzerland, which is the largest employer in Thalwil (over 500 jobs). There is also a range of shops, mainly located around the Gotthardstrasse.

The main source of Thalwil's current prosperity lies in the large number of commuters (ca. 7 000) who live there but work in the economic centres of Greater Zurich. Today, Thalwil has mostly left its farming and industrial past behind and become a commuter base.

== Transportation ==
Thalwil is located along the A3 motorway from Zurich to Chur as well as on the main railway lines from Zurich to Chur, Lucerne and Italy. In the summer, there are regular boats to Zurich as well as along the lake to Rapperswil, run by the Zürichsee-Schifffahrtsgesellschaft. Thalwil railway station is served by lines S2, S8, and S24 of the Zürich S-Bahn. The Zimmerberg bus line (Zimmerbergbus), provided by the Sihltal Zürich Uetliberg Bahn (SZU), connects the Zimmerberg region and parts of the Sihl valley.

== Sightseeing ==
- Church with views over the lake
- Pfisterhaus with the village museum
- Etzliberg viewing point and old half-timbered houses
- Villa Diana, the 19th-century neo-baroque residence of factory owner Julius Schwarzenbach

== Notable people ==
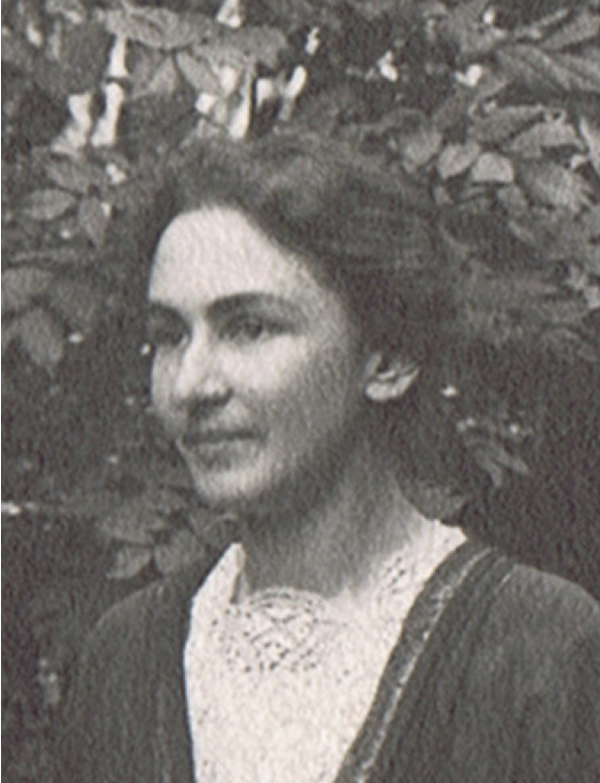
Tina Keller Jenny, 1912

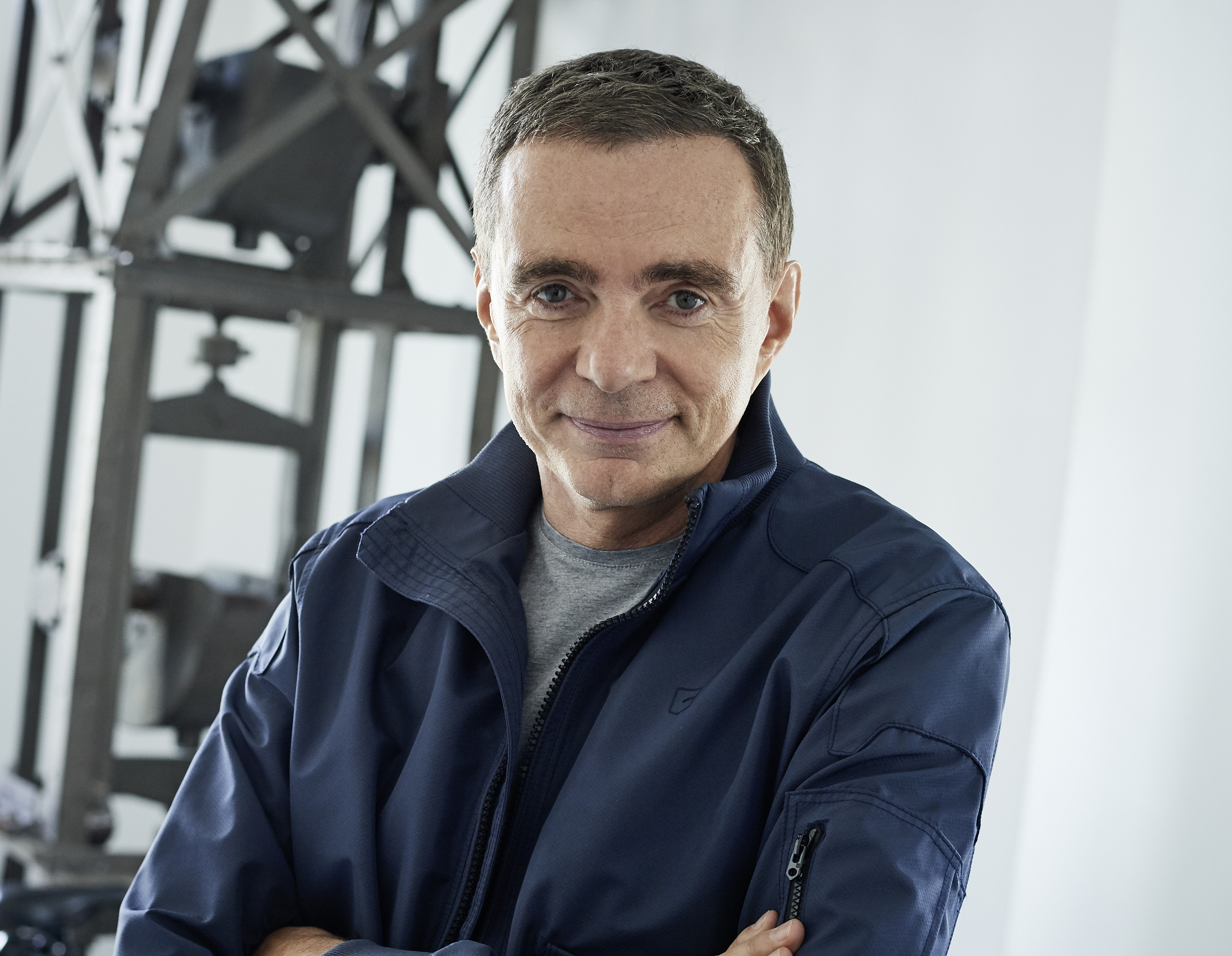
Reto Saimbeni, 2017

- Tina Keller-Jenny (1887–1985), Swiss physician and Jungian psychotherapist, brought up in the Jenny-Castle, Thalwil
- Hans Johner (1889 – 1975 in Thalwil), a Swiss chess player and musician
- Ferdinand Sigg (1902 in Thalwil – 1965), bishop of the Methodist Episcopal Church
- George Piranian (1914 in Thalwil – 2009), a Swiss-American mathematician and Rhodes Scholar of Swiss and Armenian descent, emigrated to the US in 1929
- Ursula Schäppi (born 1940), actress, playwright and comedian; lives in Thalwil
- Urs Schwarzenbach (born 1948 in Thalwil), UK-based Swiss billionaire financier
- Bruno Saile (born 1952 in Thalwil), a Swiss rower
- Reto Salimbeni (born 1958, in Thalwil), a filmmaker and director known for his features and commercials
- Martin Bäumle (born 1964 in Thalwil), is a Swiss scientist and politician
- Manuela Müller (born 1980 in Thalwil), a Swiss freestyle skier, competed at the 2002 and 2006 Winter Olympics
- Adrian Winter (born 1986 in Thalwil), a Swiss professional footballer with over 250 club caps

== See also ==
- Spelunke in vivo
