= Adolf Keller =

Swiss Protestant theologian and professor

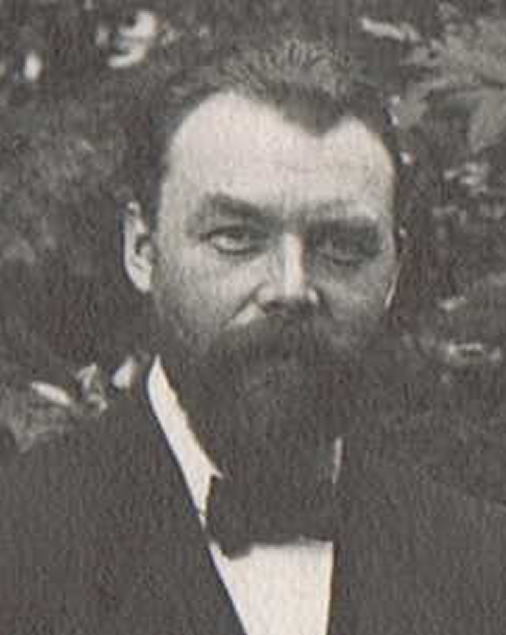
- Born: 1872; Rüdlingen, Switzerland
- Died: 1963 (aged 90–91); Los Angeles
- Resting place: Forest Lawn Memorial Park (Hollywood Hills)
- Occupations: Protestant theologian, professor and Secretary-General of the European Central Office for Ecclesiastical Aid
- Spouse: Tina Keller-Jenny

Adolf Keller (February 1872 – 10 February 1963) was a Swiss Protestant theologian, professor and Secretary-General of the European Central Office for Ecclesiastical Aid.

Born in Rüdlingen, the son of Johann Georg Keller and Margaretha Buchter, he attended high school in Schaffhausen, studied theology in Basel and Berlin with Adolf von Harnack and Adolf Schlatter, and philosophy, art history and later psychology in Geneva. After his ordination in 1896, he served as a pastor for the Protestant community in Cairo (1896), in Burg, Stein am Rhein (1899) and then in Geneva (1904), where he met and befriended Karl Barth as his vicar, and finally at St Peter's parish church in Zurich. He was a friend of Sigmund Freud, Carl Jung, Thomas Mann, and Albert Schweitzer – and thus was influenced by the spiritual tendencies of the twentieth century. Keller was one of the first pastors to become interested in psychoanalysis and met Jung in 1907, and later at the fourth psychoanalytical congress in Munich 1912, where he witnessed the break between Sigmund Freud and C.G. Jung. He took sides with Jung, since he found Freud's claim that every neurosis stemmed from sexual trauma too one sided. He then played an active role in the 'Zurich school' and in the Psychological Club giving lectures.

Keller occupied a key position as the first German-speaking secretary of the Swiss Federation of Protestant Churches (1941) founded in 1920. In addition, he served until 1945 as Secretary-General of the European Central Office for Ecclesiastical Aid, founded in 1922, and dedicated to the Europe and Russian, Armenian, Assyrian-born and "non-Aryan" refugees.

Adolf Keller left a rich literary work. In addition to publications on the ecumenical movement, it also includes an introduction to the philosophy of Henri Bergson, contributions to the relationship between psychoanalysis and Christianity and several volumes in which "secular devotions" are collected.

He received the Honorary degree of the University of Geneva in 1922 and Yale University in 1927. Adolf Keller emigrated to Evanston, California, in 1954. He was married to Tina Keller-Jenny and died on February 10, 1963, in Los Angeles, three days after his 91st birthday. Keller is buried at the Forest Lawn Memorial Park (Hollywood Hills).

== Works (a selection) ==
- Karl Barth and Christian unity: the influence of the Barthian movement upon the churches of the world, ISBN 9781298828491
- Five minutes to twelve: a spiritual interpretation of the Oxford and Edinburgh Conferences, Cokesbury Press, 2013, ISBN 9781494013776
- Eine Philosophie des Lebens (Henri Bergson). Diederichs, Jena 1914.
- Dynamis. Formen und Kräfte des amerikanischen Protestantismus. Mohr, Tübingen 1921.
- Die Kirchen und der Friede mit besonderer Berücksichtigung ihrer Stellung zum Völkerbund. Furche, Berlin 1927.
- Auf der Schwelle. Einsichten und Ausblicke in die tiefere Wirklichkeit. Wanderer-Verlag, Zürich 1929.
- Der Weg der dialektischen Theologie durch die kirchliche Welt. Eine kleine Kirchenkunde der Gegenwart. Kaiser, München 1931.
- Vom Unbekannten Gott. Not und Hoffnung der Gegenwart. Wanderer-Verlag, Zürich; Klotz, Gotha 1933.
- Von Geist und Liebe. Ein Bilderbuch aus dem Leben. Wanderer-Verlag, Zürich; Klotz, Gotha 1937.
- Am Fuße des Leuchtturms. Wanderer-Verlag, Zürich 1940.
- Amerikanisches Christentum – heute. Evangelischer Verlag, Zollikon/Zürich 1943.

== Literature ==
- Marianne Jehle-Wildberger: C. G. Jung und Adolf Keller. Über Theologie und Psychologie: Briefe und Gespräche. Theologischer Verlag Zürich, Zurich 2014, ISBN 9783290177706
- Hermann Kocher: Rationierte Menschlichkeit: schweizerischer Protestantismus im Spannungsfeld von Flüchtlingsnot und öffentlicher Flüchtlingspolitik der Schweiz, 1933–1948. 1996. (with biography.)
- Urs Leu: Adolf Keller (Theologe). In: Biographisch-Bibliographisches Kirchenlexikon (BBKL). Band 3, Bautz, Herzberg 1992, ISBN 3-88309-035-2, Sp. 1302–1305.
- Birger Maiwald: Ökumenischer Kirchenkampf: die «Berner Erklärung» des Schweizerischen Evangelischen Kirchenbundes von 1934. 1997.
- Rudolf Pfister: Keller, Adolf. In: Neue Deutsche Biographie (NDB). Band 11, Duncker & Humblot, Berlin 1977, ISBN 3-428-00192-3, S. 431 f. (Digitalisat).
- Marianne Jehle-Wildberger: Adolf Keller (1872-1963): Ecumenist, World Citizen, Philanthropist, Lutterworth Press, ISBN 9780718893156
