= Authentic Movement =

Form of expressive movement therapy

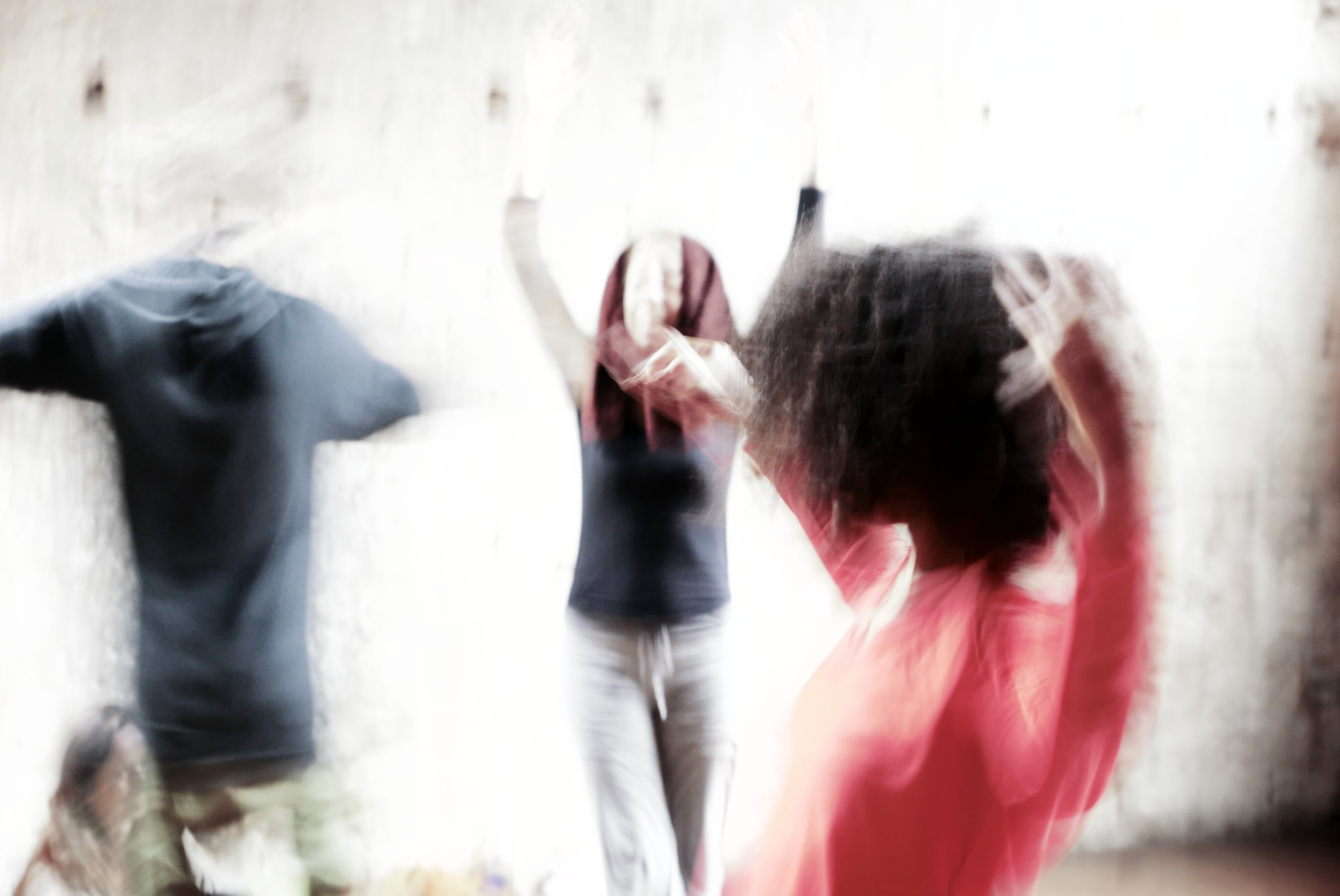
Several people moving with their eyes closed, listening to their own sensations

Authentic Movement (AM) is a form of expressive movement therapy which grew out of an inner-directed approach to movement developed by Mary Starks Whitehouse. It was described as unpremeditated, genuine, or "authentic." Whitehouse called her work "Movement-in-depth." Janet Adler developed this approach into a practice involving a mover and a witness.

== History ==
Whitehouse (1911–1979) was a student of famed Martha Graham and Mary Wigman, who became a professional dancer and subsequent teacher. Informed by her interest in and experience with Jungian psychology, particularly active imagination, projection, and polarities, Whitehouse integrated her study of dance and Jung into a new embodied inquiry, "an approach, an orientation" toward allowing "the unconscious to express itself in movement."

Joan Chodorow (Jungian Analyst) and Janet Adler (Dance Movement Therapist and PhD in Mystical Studies) each studied with Mary Whitehouse. Chodorow's work is based in Jungian analysis, working with Active Imagination in Movement, developmental psychology, intercultural elements, archetypes, dreams, and play. Adler's teaching of the Discipline of Authentic Movement has focused on the development of the inner witness and the study of mystical elements such as clear seeing, intuition, direct experience, and energetic phenomenon.

== Practice ==
=== Exploration ===
When starting a basic AM session, participants start in a comfortable position, eyes closed to sense their inner body-mind processes. They then wait for stimuli to arise within them, and follow each impulse expressing movement or sound. Individuals move through the space entirely free from any direction or expectation. This allows people to explore psychological processes as they arise into kinesthetic responses of movement or sound.

As Whitehouse explains, "When the movement was simple and inevitable, not to be changed no matter how limited or partial, it became what I called 'authentic' – it could be recognized as genuine, belonging to that person." The movement becomes 'authentic' when the individual is able to allow their intuitive impulses to freely express themselves without intellectual directive, as opposed to movement initiated by conscious decision making – a distinction which may appear clear, but practically a challenge. Individuals simply pay attention to what they feel at a sensory level, since "the core of the movement experience is the sensation of moving and being moved."

=== Witnessing ===
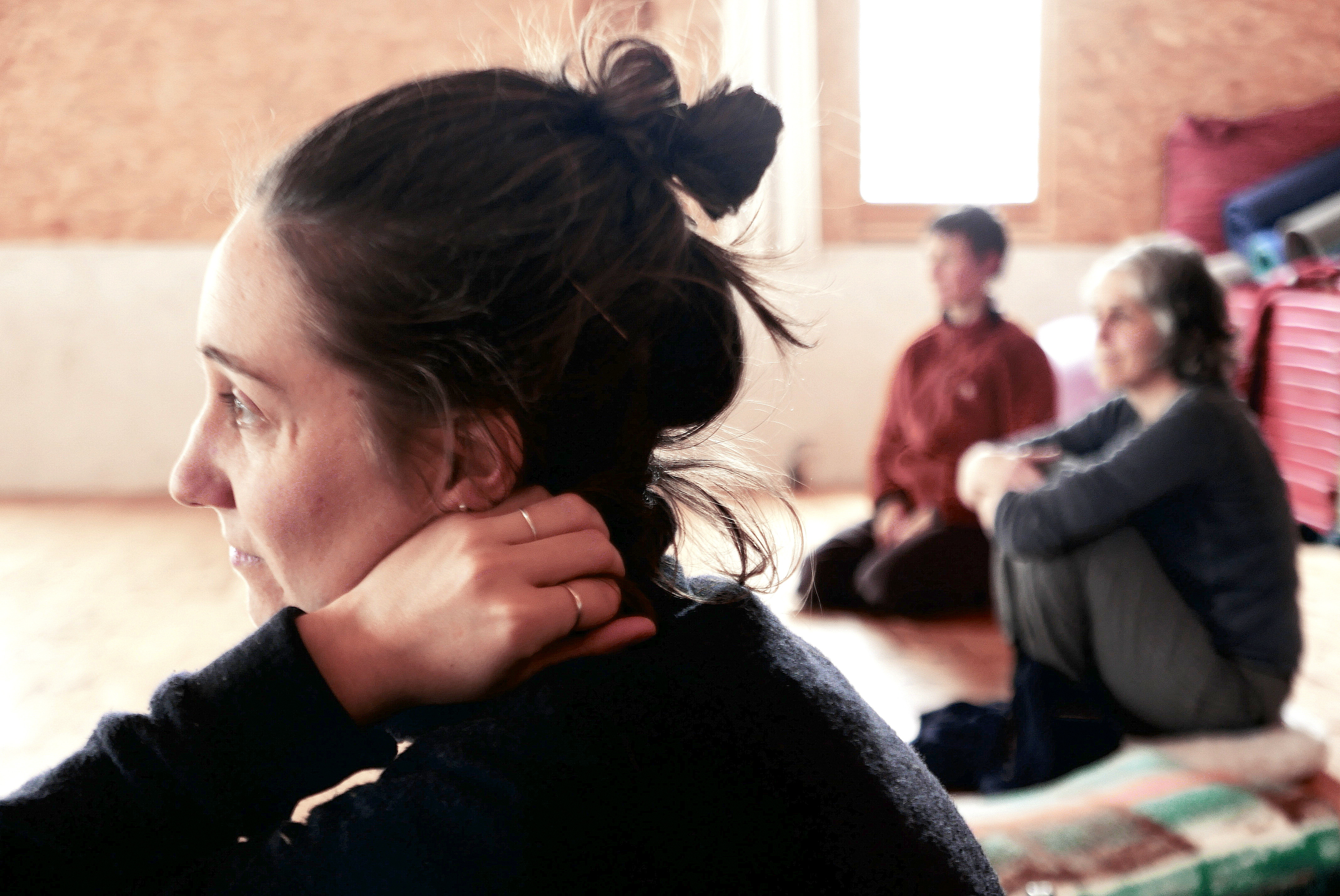
Witnesses cultivate an unconditional benevolent presence, while remaining attentive to their own experience.

In the Authentic Movement aspect of Whitehouse's approach, the moving participants (movers) are witnessed by an outer witness, who 'contains' the experience of the mover by witnessing their movements without judgement, projection or interpretation. In this way, the witness is also an active participant, as witnessing is a practice in observing one's own sensations and impulses while observing the mover's. It's important to note that Whitehouse created many individual, dyadic and group experiences to create a context for moving from inner sensation and whole-body experience.

=== Practitioners ===
Whitehouse brought up two main figures in this field, Joan Chodorow and Janet Adler. Both women cultivated and taught this therapeutic/somatic art in two very different directions. While Joan Chodorow's work is based in Jungian analysis, working with Active Imagination in Movement, developmental psychology, intercultural elements, archetypes, dreams, and play, Janet Adler's work is anchored in Buddhist psychology, mindfulness and mysticism. Adler coined her approach in the term "The Discipline of Authentic Movement" in order to distinguish the course of this practice.

The Authentic Movement Institute, co-founded by Neala Haze and Tina Stromsted in Berkeley, California, offered an intensive training program in the study and practice of Authentic Movement. Joined by Chodorow and Adler as founding faculty, and adjunct teachers in areas of special focus, their program served students who are among those teaching and practicing Authentic Movement today in a wide range of countries.

Subsequent generations of practitioners have furthered moving and witnessing practice, including diverse perspectives and applications in the arts [14], education, analytic/therapeutic training, medical recovery, differing levels of physical abilities, diversity awareness, conflict mediation, meditation, sacred dance, mystical practice, and ecopsychology.

=== Comparisons ===
Authentic Movement, in a similar way to Elsa Gindler's 'Human Work' in concentration, has revealingly comparable elements to several forms of Eastern Buddhist philosophy. The close attention that is paid to sensation, which as Vedanā in most Buddhist practices is to be observed without judgment, suggests Whitehouse may have been influenced by this. Also, the term witness has been widely used in Buddhism referring to the aspect of the individual that is capable of observing other aspects of him/herself without judgement or discernment. Buddhism has a long history in United States, and gave rise in the 1950s in particular with the work of D. T. Suzuki through works such as Outlines of Mahayana Buddhism and An Introduction to Zen Buddhism. In this light, AM can also be seen as a type of moving meditation.

With many different approaches, exercises or practices (other than the basic practice above), AM is done not only in therapeutic sessions, but also as groups for personal expression of the unconscious mind. For many, it is a type of spiritual practice.
