= Hans Schneider (footballer) =

Swiss footballer

Personal information
- Full name: Hans Schneider
- Place of birth: Switzerland
- Position: Striker

Senior career*
Years	Team	Apps	(Gls)
1921–1926	FC Basel	15	(1)
- * Club domestic league appearances and goals

Hans Schneider was a Swiss footballer who played for FC Basel as a striker.

Schneider joined FC Basel in 1921, but didn't play his first test game for the team until 5 June 1922. He played his domestic league debut on 30 November 1924 in the goalless draw against Old Boys. Between the years 1921 and 1926 Schneider played a total of 26 games for Basel, scoring one goal. 15 of these games were in the Swiss Serie A, two in the Swiss Cup and nine were friendly games. He scored his goal in the domestic league in the 3–2 home win against Grenchen on 3 May 1925.

== Sources ==
- Rotblau: Jahrbuch Saison 2017/2018. Publisher: FC Basel Marketing AG. ISBN 978-3-7245-2189-1
- Die ersten 125 Jahre. Publisher: Josef Zindel im Friedrich Reinhardt Verlag, Basel. ISBN 978-3-7245-2305-5
- Verein "Basler Fussballarchiv" Homepage
