= 1924–25 Swiss Serie A =

Swiss football season

Swiss Serie A
- Season: 1924–25

Statistics of Swiss Super League in the 1924–25 season.

== East ==
=== Table ===
Pos	Team	Pld	W	D	L	GF	GA	GD	Pts
1	Young Fellows Zürich	16	13	1	2	56	28	+28	27
2	FC St. Gallen	16	11	1	4	28	20	+8	23
3	Grasshopper Club Zürich	16	9	1	6	40	38	+2	19
4	FC Zürich	16	9	0	7	50	33	+17	18
5	Sportclub Veltheim	16	7	1	8	27	29	−2	15
6	Blue Stars Zürich	16	7	0	9	38	43	−5	14
7	FC Winterthur	16	4	3	9	32	45	−13	11
8	FC Lugano	16	4	2	10	30	44	−14	10
9	Brühl St. Gallen	16	2	3	11	22	43	−21	7

Source: rsssf.com

=== Results ===
Home \ Away	BSZ	BRÜ	GCZ	LUG	STG	VEL	WIN	YFZ	ZÜR
Blue Stars Zürich		4–1	2–3	3–2	1–2	1–3	6–2	1–3	5–4
Brühl	1–6		0–2	2–2	2–2	2–3	3–1	4–3	1–3
Grasshopper	2–4	3–2		3–3	0–1	5–3	6–3	1–3	3–2
Lugano	2–0	3–0	2–4		2–0	0–1	1–3	4–6	2–7
St. Gallen	3–0	1–0	2–0	2–0		3–0	2–1	1–0	2–1
Veltheim	0–1	2–1	0–2	2–1	1–2		2–0	1–3	0–3
Winterthur	5–2	0–0	2–3	2–4	3–2	1–1		2–2	1–4
Young Fellows	5–1	3–2	4–1	5–1	5–2	3–2	7–3		2–1
Zürich	5–1	5–1	5–2	4–1	4–1	1–6	0–3	1–2	

Legend: Blue = home team win; Yellow = draw; Red = away team win.

== Central ==
=== Table ===
Pos	Team	Pld	W	D	L	GF	GA	GD	Pts
1	FC Bern	16	9	5	2	25	10	+15	23
2	FC Aarau	16	8	4	4	25	17	+8	20
3	Old Boys Basel	16	7	5	4	33	23	+10	19
4	FC Basel	16	7	5	4	15	13	+2	19
5	Young Boys Bern	16	7	3	6	26	18	+8	17
6	Nordstern Basel	16	5	4	7	17	13	+4	14
7	FC Grenchen	16	4	4	8	17	23	−6	12
8	FC Concordia Basel	16	4	4	8	15	25	−10	12
9	FC Lucerne	16	2	4	10	12	43	−31	8

Source: rsssf.com

=== Results ===
Home \ Away	AAR	BAS	BER	CON	GRE	LUZ	NOR	OBB	YB
Aarau		4–0	1–2	1–0	2–1	2–2	2–1	3–1	1–1
Basel	0–0		0–0	1–0	3–2	2–0	1–0	0–0	0–2
Bern	3–2	2–1		2–3	2–1	4–0	0–1	0–0	0–0
Concordia	0–2	0–0	0–2		0–0	1–1	2–1	6–1	2–1
Grenchen	2–0	0–3	0–0	2–0		4–1	2–1	1–3	0–1
Luzern	1–0	0–3	1–4	2–1	1–1		0–2	0–0	0–3
Nordstern	0–1	0–1	0–0	0–0	0–0	4–0		0–0	2–1
Old Boys	2–2	3–0	0–2	4–0	3–1	6–2	2–5		6–1
Young Boys	1–2	0–0	0–2	5–0	3–0	6–1	1–0	0–2	

Legend: Blue = home team win; Yellow = draw; Red = away team win.

== West ==
=== Table ===
Pos	Team	Pld	W	D	L	GF	GA	GD	Pts
1	Servette Genf	16	12	3	1	38	12	+26	27
2	Lausanne Sports	16	10	3	3	31	19	+12	23
3	Etoile Carouge	16	9	4	3	37	14	+23	22
4	Etoile La Chaux-de-Fonds	16	7	3	6	20	18	+2	17
5	FC Fribourg	16	6	4	6	21	26	−5	16
6	FC La Chaux-de-Fonds	16	3	7	6	15	21	−6	13
7	Cantonal Neuchatel	16	4	4	8	21	31	−10	12
8	Urania Geneve Sports	16	2	3	11	16	32	−16	7
9	Montreux Sports	16	2	3	11	16	42	−26	7

Source: rsssf.com

=== Results ===
Home \ Away	CAN	CDF	ÉTC	ÉTS	FRI	LS	MON	SER	UGS
Cantonal Neuchâtel		1–1	2–2	0–0	1–0	0–2	5–1	1–2	3–1
Chaux-de-Fonds	0–0		1–1	1–0	1–1	0–1	2–1	0–3	1–0
Étoile Carouge	3–0	2–2		1–1	7–1	0–1	6–0	0–1	4–0
Étoile-Sporting	3–1	2–1	0–1		1–0	2–0	2–0	2–3	1–0
Fribourg	3–2	1–0	1–4	3–0		2–2	0–0	0–0	3–2
Lausanne-Sports	3–1	2–1	2–0	2–1	3–2		3–3	0–1	4–0
Montreux-Sports	1–2	3–1	0–1	2–2	0–1	1–3		1–4	3–1
Servette	4–3	1–1	2–4	3–0	3–1	3–1	6–0		0–0
Urania	5–1	2–2	0–1	0–3	0–2	2–2	3–0	0–2	

Legend: Blue = home team win; Yellow = draw; Red = away team win.

== Final ==
=== Table ===
Pos	Team	Pld	W	D	L	GF	GA	GD	Pts
1	Servette Genf	2	1	1	0	1	0	+1	3
2	FC Bern	2	1	0	1	4	3	+1	2
3	Young Fellows Zürich	2	0	1	1	2	4	−2	1

Source: rsssf.com

=== Results ===
Team 1	Score	Team 2
3 May 1925
Young Fellows	0–0	Servette
17 May 1925
Bern	4–2	Young Fellows
7 June 1925
Servette	1–0	Bern

Servette Genf won the championship.

== Sources ==
- Switzerland 1924-25 at RSSSF
