= American Dance Therapy Association =

Organization dedicated to dance/movement therapy

American Dance Therapy Association is the only organization solely dedicated to the growth and enhancement of the profession of dance/movement therapy (DMT). It was founded in 1966 by Marian Chace, Elissa Queyquep White, Claire Schmais, and several practitioners from across the United States.

== History ==
Dance/movement therapy has been a distinct profession since the 1940s. The pioneers of the movement saw the relationship of how the body and mind interact in health and in illness. Whether it be an illness of the mind which affects the body, or an illness of the body that impacts the mind and spirit, these early therapists saw the need to treat these issues.

== Today ==
- ADTA maintains a registry of dance/movement therapists
- Sets and monitors standards for the master's level programs
- Publishes the American Journal of Dance Therapy twice a year
- Publishes timely monographs for its members and for allied professionals
- Holds a professional conference every year
- Supports formation of regional groups, conferences, seminars, workshops and meetings
