= Marian Chace =

American dance therapist

Marian Chace (31 October 1896 – 19 July 1970) was an American dance teacher, and one of the founders of modern dance therapy.

Marian Chace was born 31 October 1896 in Providence, Rhode Island, the daughter of Daniel Champlin Chace, a journalist and editor, and Harriet Edgaretta (Northrop) Chace. Her younger siblings were Marjorie (1899–1991), Olive (1905–1977), and Edgar Northrop Chace (1908–1983).

She studied modern dance and choreography with Ted Shawn and Ruth St. Denis at the Denishawn School of Dance and started work as a dance performer. She later moved to Washington, D.C., and opened her own studio. As she developed her teaching she believed that the body and mind are interrelated, and was influenced by the work of Harry Stack Sullivan.

She began to teach in Washington D.C., and wondered why people who were not wanting to be performers continued to take dance classes. She began to change her teaching methods as she observed her students closely. Her students reported feelings of well being which intrigued local doctors, some of the National Institutes of Health, who began to send some of their patients to her classes. Her approach developed into the use of body action, symbolism, therapeutic movement relationship, and rhythmic group activity when she eventually joined the staff at St. Elizabeths hospital in southeast Washington D.C. and studied at the Washington School of Psychiatry. Chace taught in schools and hospitals advocating and lecturing on the therapeutic benefits of dance/body movement.

She worked for number of years with patients at Chestnut Lodge in Rockville Maryland. She taught a course at Turtle Bay Music School in New York City for a number of years. With others in the field she enabled the founding of the American Dance Therapy Association in 1966 and became its first president.
