= Dance therapy =

Psychotherapeutic use of movement and dance

Dance/movement therapy
- MeSH: D003614

Dance/movement therapy (DMT) in USA and Australia or dance movement psychotherapy (DMP) in the UK is the psychotherapeutic use of movement and dance to support intellectual, emotional, and motor functions of the body. As a modality of the creative arts therapies, DMT looks at the correlation between movement and emotion.

== Efficacy ==
Dance/movement therapy, alone and in conjunction with other forms of therapy, has been shown to be an effective form of treatment for anxiety and anxiety related disorders across age ranges and across a wide population of individuals. Certain studies show that dance movement therapy has been an effective form of anxiety treatment for those with and without intellectual disabilities and musculoskeletal disorders. It has also been shown to be effective at reducing aggression in young children.

There are insufficient high quality trials to assess the effect of DMT on behavioral, social, cognitive and emotional symptoms in people with dementia.

== Principles ==
The theory of DMT is based mainly upon the belief that body and mind interact. Both conscious and unconscious movement of the person, based on the dualist mind body premise, affects total control, and also reflects the individual's personality. Therefore, the therapist-client relationship is partly based on non-verbal cues such as body language. Movement is believed to have a symbolic function and as such can aid in understanding the self. Movement improvisation allows the client to experiment with new ways of being and DMT provides a manner or channel in which the client can consciously understand early relationships with negative experiences through non-verbal mediation by the therapist.

By integrating the body, mind, and spirit, DMT aims to foster a sense of wholeness among participants. The body refers to the "discharging of energy through muscular-skeletal responses to stimuli received by the brain." The mind refers to "mental activities...such as memory, imagery, perception, attention, evaluation, reasoning and decision making." The spirit refers to the "subjectively experienced feeling of engaging in or empathically observing dancing."

Dance movement therapy works to improve the social skills, as well as relational dynamics among the clients that choose to participate in it to better improve their quality of life. This therapy seeks to deepen clients' self-awareness through a meditative process that involves movement, motion, and realization through exploration of one's body.

== Methodology ==
DMT/P methodology is fairly heterogenous and practitioners draw on a variety of psychotherapeutic and kinetic principles. Most training in Dance Movement Therapy will have an established theoretical base which they work from – for example Psychodynamic theory, Humanistic psychology, Integrative therapy, Cognitive behavioral therapy, Existential therapy etc. Depending on the approach or combinations of approaches practitioners work from very different processes and aims will be worked towards.

Additionally to the psychotherapeutic basis of their work, different approaches to movement and dance may be employed.

Some dance therapists use codified dance styles, like ballet, folk dance, and contemporary dance. Majority of dance therapists work within a kinetic framework of creative and expressive movement practices, incorporating structured improvisation.

Commonly requirements of most DMT/P graduate programmes are Movement Analysis and Profiling, human development and Developmental psychology.

Additionally since a variety of populations may be encountered in DMT/P, methods are adapted to meet the needs of the circumstances and clients and this further reduces standardisation.

Bonnie Meekums, a second wave dance therapist, described four stages of the therapy process, based on her experience in the field:

Preparation: the warm-up stage, a safe space is established without obstacles nor distractions, a supportive relationship with a witness is formed, comfort for participants to be familiar with moving with their eyes closed.

Incubation: leader verbally prompts participant to go into subconscious, open-ended imagery used to create an internal environment that is catered to the participant, relaxed atmosphere, symbolic movements.

Illumination: process which is integrated through conscious awareness via dialogue with witness, self-reflection in which the participant uncovers and resolves subconscious motivations, increased self awareness, can have positive and negative effects.

Evaluation: discuss insights and significance of the process, prepare to end therapy

== The use of props ==
Dance movement therapists frequently use props during sessions to support grounding skills and to increase clients' awareness of their bodies and personal boundaries. These props might include blankets, sensory balls, weighted blankets, colorful scarves, coloring pencils, and resistance bands. Clients also often can select the type of music they prefer for the session.

== Proposed mechanisms ==
Various hypothesis have been proposed for mechanisms by which dance therapy may benefit participants. There is a social component to dance therapy, which can be valuable for psychological functioning through human interaction. Another possible mechanism is the music that is used during the session, which may be able to reduce pain, decrease anxiety, and increase relaxation. Since dance requires learning and involves becoming active and discovering capacities for movement, there is also the physical training that could provide benefits as well. Dancing may be considered more uplifting and enjoyable than other types of exercise. Dance therapy can also involve nonverbal communication, "which enables participants to express their feelings without words. This might be helpful when normal communication is absent or has broken down (eg, for patients with dementia)."

== Locations ==
DMT is practiced in a large variety of locations. Such locations include:

- Physical medicine
- Rehabilitation centers
- Medical settings
- Education school facilities
- Nursing Homes
- Day care facilities
- Disease prevention centers
- Health promotion programs
- Hospitals
- Mental health settings
- Private practice

== Organizations ==
Organizations such as the American Dance Therapy Association were created in order to uphold high standards in the field of DMT. Such organizations help connect individuals to therapists and DMT.

=== American Dance Therapy Association ===
American Dance Therapy Association (ADTA) was founded in 1966 in order to uphold high standards throughout dance therapy. The ADTA was created by Marian Chace, the first president of the ADTA, Elissa Queyquep White, Claire Schmais, and other pioneers in dance movement. Along with setting standards for which therapists must attain to become licensed therapists, ADTA keeps an updated registry of all movement/dance therapists who have met ADTA's standards. In addition, ADTA also publishes the American Journal of Dance Therapy and sponsors annual professional conferences. According to the ADTA, movement is considered to be a language which allows our body. mind, and spirit to communicate. There are recorded webinars that you can watch at any point in time that can educate and give you more knowledge about the dance therapy field. Along with this, there are also live webinars that you can purchase which allow you to receive a deeper education about how you can use dance therapy in your daily life.

=== Association for Dance Movement Psychotherapy, United Kingdom ===
The Association for Dance Movement Psychotherapy, United Kingdom (ADMP UK) was one of the first organizations established to regulate the field of dance therapy. ADMP UK accredits therapists and oversees that all regulations are followed. The association actively promotes dance in the UK and other countries, and collaborates with other art therapy organizations. The ADMP UK is providing dance therapy to the community which can be done individually or in group sessions. They use Dance Movement Psychotherapy (DMP), which explains how body movement is a key instrument of expression and communication, throughout these sessions. DMP can support trust within the relationships in your life, the potential for you to physically and spiritually grow within yourself, and the discovery of who you truly are.

=== European Association Dance Movement Therapy ===
The European Association of Dance Movement Therapy is an umbrella association which represents national professional bodies for Dance Movement Therapy in Europe. It represents members in Germany, Greece, Hungary, Italy, Latvia, Netherlands, Poland, Russia, Spain and the UK; with partial members in Austria, Czech Republic, Finland, France, Switzerland, Ukraine and associate members in Croatia, Cyprus, Denmark, Israel, Portugal, Romania and Sweden. Their mission statement is to work extremely hard to continue the development of dance therapy and the legal recognition of this practice. This association aims to exchange ideas and collaborate with other countries about dance therapy.

NVDAT (Nederlandse Vereniging voor Danstherapie-Dutch Dance Movement Therapy Association) The Nederlandse Vereniging voor Danstherapie supports the interests of dance movement therapists based in The Netherlands.

=== Korean Dance Therapy Association ===
The Korean Dance Therapy Association was established in 1993 by Dr. Ryu Boon Soon as the first dance therapy association in South Korea. It was modeled after the structure of the ADTA and provides education, credentialing, and professional development opportunities to dance therapists in Korea.

== Allied professions ==
Allied professions are areas that a person could do, special studies, short courses, or eventually become trained in the area of DMT.

- Dance
- Physical education
- Occupational therapy
- Physiotherapy
- Psychology
- Art therapy

== Therapist qualifications ==
American Association of Dance Therapy

ADTA is the main regulator of the required education and training in order to become a dance/movement therapist in the USA. A master's degree is required to become a dance/movement therapist. "Registered Dance/Movement Therapist" (R-DMT) is the title given to entry-level dance/movement therapists who have completed requisite education and a minimum 700-hour supervised clinical internship. Those who have completed over 2400 hours of supervised professional clinical work may apply for the advanced credential "Board Certified Dance/Movement Therapist (BC-DMT).

Association for Dance Movement Psychotherapy, United Kingdom

ADMP UK is the main regulator of the required education and training in order to become a dance/movement therapist in the UK. The ADMP is also a member of the European Association Dance Movement Therapy (EADMT). To become a licensed dance/movement therapist, a Master's Degree in Dance Movement Psychotherapy (DMP) is required. There are three DMP training programs in the UK – at the Goldsmiths University of London, University of Roehampton in London, and University of Derby.

European Association of Dance Movement Therapy

EADMT is the main regulator of the required education and training in order to become a dance/movement therapist in the EU. DMT training is taught in private and university settings across the EU in countries that include Austria, Estonia, Germany, Greece, Hungary, Italy, Latvia, the Netherlands, Poland, Russia, Spain, and the United Kingdom. Introductory course training in DMT ranges from 10–120 hours. These hours vary based on country. Full university accreditation courses at the bachelor's and postgraduate levels range from 2–4 years.

The EADMT training standard criteria were adopted by the EADMT General Assembly in Barcelona, Spain in 2017. These criteria help DMT programs meet best practice and achieve high quality DMT practitioners across Europe.

== Education ==
Typically becoming a dance therapist requires a graduate degree of at least a Master's level. There is no specific undergraduate degree, however many practitioners hold undergraduate degrees fields in, or related to, psychology or dance.

All master's degrees in the UK and the USA require clinical placements, personal therapy and supervision, as well as experiential and theoretical learning, and typically require between 2 and 3 years to complete. Upon completion of a Masters graduates are eligible to register as Dance Movement Therapists/Psychotherapists with their professional associations. In the UK graduates may also register with the UK Council of Psychotherapists(UKCP).

It is also possible to register as a Dance Movement Therapist/Psychotherapist without a DMT/DMP Masters. This usually requires equilvilant psychotherapeutic training and substantial experience of applying dance into therapeutic settings.

== History ==
The American Dance Therapy Association was founded in 1966 as an organization to support the emerging profession of dance/movement therapy and is the only U.S. organization dedicated to the profession of dance/movement therapy.

Dance has been used therapeutically for thousands of years. It has been used as a healing ritual in the influence of fertility, birth, sickness, and death since early human history. Over the period from 1840 to 1930, a new philosophy of dance developed in Europe and the United States, defined by the idea that movement could have an effect on the mover vis-a-vis that dance was not simply an expressive art. There is a general opinion that Dance/movement as active imagination was originated by Jung in 1916, developed in the 1960s by dance therapy pioneer Mary Starks Whitehouse. Tina Keller-Jenny and other therapists started practicing the therapy in 1940. The actual establishment of dance as a therapy and as a profession occurred in the 1950s, beginning with future American Dance Therapy Association founder Marian Chace.

=== First wave ===
Marian Chace spearheaded the movement of dance in the medical community as a form of therapy. She is considered the principal founder of what is now dance therapy in the United States. In 1942, through her work, dance was first introduced to western medicine. Chace was originally a dancer, choreographer, and performer. After opening her own dance school in Washington, D.C., Chace began to realize the effects dance and movement had on her students. The reported feelings of wellbeing from her students began to attract the attention of the medical community, and some local doctors began sending patients to her classes. She was soon asked to work at St. Elizabeth's Hospital in Washington, D.C. once psychiatrists too realized the benefits their patients were receiving from attending Chace's dance classes. In 1966 Chace became the first president of the American Dance Therapy Association, an organization which she and several other DMT pioneers founded. According to the ADTA, dance is "the psychotherapeutic use of movement as a process which furthers the emotional, social, cognitive, and physical integration of the individual."

=== Second wave ===
The second wave of Dance Movement Therapy came around the 1970s to the 1980s and it sparked much interest from American therapists. During this time, therapists began to experiment with the psychotherapeutic applications of dance and movement. As a result of the therapists' experiments, DMT was then categorized as a form of psychotherapy. It was from this second wave that today's Dance Movement Therapy evolved.

== See also ==
- Authentic Movement
- Expressive therapy
- Process art
- Rudolf Laban
